= Japanese sculpture =

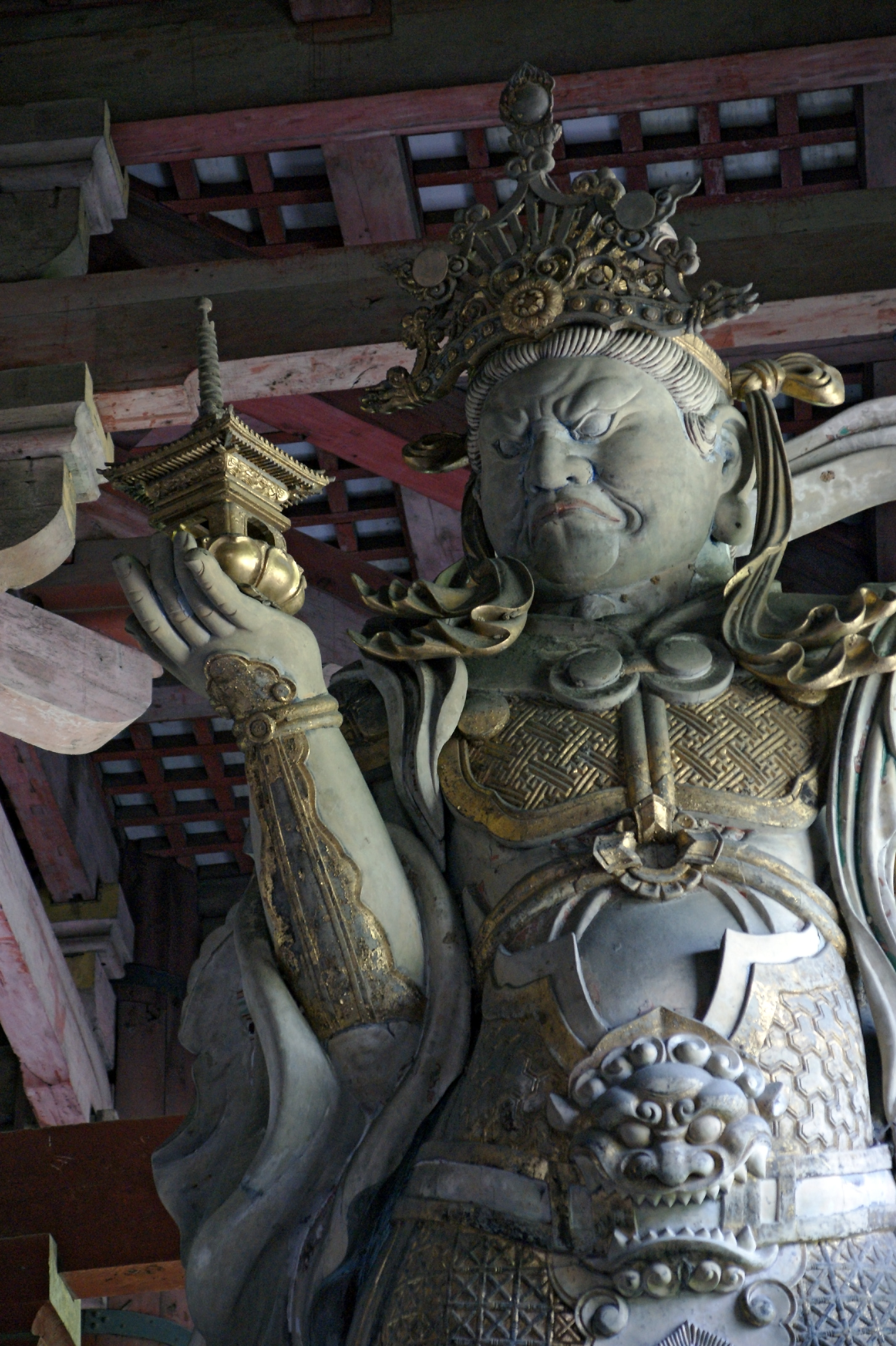
Tamonten in Tōdai-ji, Wood, Edo period

Sculpture in Japan began with the clay figure. Towards the end of the long Neolithic Jōmon period, "flame-rimmed" pottery vessels had sculptural extensions to the rim, and very stylized pottery dogū figures were produced, many with the characteristic "snow-goggle" eyes. During the Kofun period of the 3rd to 6th century CE, haniwa terracotta figures of humans and animals in a simplistic style were erected outside important tombs. The arrival of Buddhism in the 6th century brought with it sophisticated traditions in sculpture, Chinese styles mediated via Korea. The 7th-century Hōryū-ji and its contents have survived more intact than any East Asian Buddhist temple of its date, with works including a Shaka Trinity of 623 in bronze, showing the historical Buddha flanked by two bodhisattvas and also the Guardian Kings of the Four Directions.

Jōchō is said not only to be one of the greatest Buddhist sculptors in the Heian period but also in the history of Buddhist statues in Japan. Jōchō redefined the body shape of Buddha statues by perfecting the technique of yosegi zukuri (寄木造り) which is a combination of several woods. The peaceful expression and graceful figure of the Buddha statue that he made completed a Japanese style of sculpture of Buddha statues called Jōchō yō ('Jōchō style', 定朝様) and determined the style of Japanese Buddhist statues of the later period. His achievement dramatically raised the social status of busshi (Buddhist sculptor) in Japan.

In the Kamakura period, the Minamoto clan established the Kamakura shogunate and the Samurai class ruled virtually all of Japan for the first time. Jocho's successors, sculptors of the Kei school of Buddhist statues, created realistic and dynamic statues to suit the tastes of samurai, and Japanese Buddhist sculpture reached its peak. Sculptors Unkei, Kaikei, and Tankei gained renown by replacing temples' Buddha statues that had been lost in wars or fires, such as those at Kofuku-ji.

Almost all subsequent significant large sculpture in Japan was Buddhist, with some Shinto equivalents, and after Buddhism declined in Japan in the 15th century, monumental sculpture became largely architectural decoration. However sculptural work in the decorative arts was developed to a remarkable level of technical achievement and refinement in small objects such as inro and netsuke in many materials, and metal tosogu or Japanese sword mountings. In the 19th century there were export industries of small bronze sculptures, ivory and porcelain figurines, and other types of small sculpture, increasingly emphasizing technical accomplishment.

== History ==
=== Ancient art ===
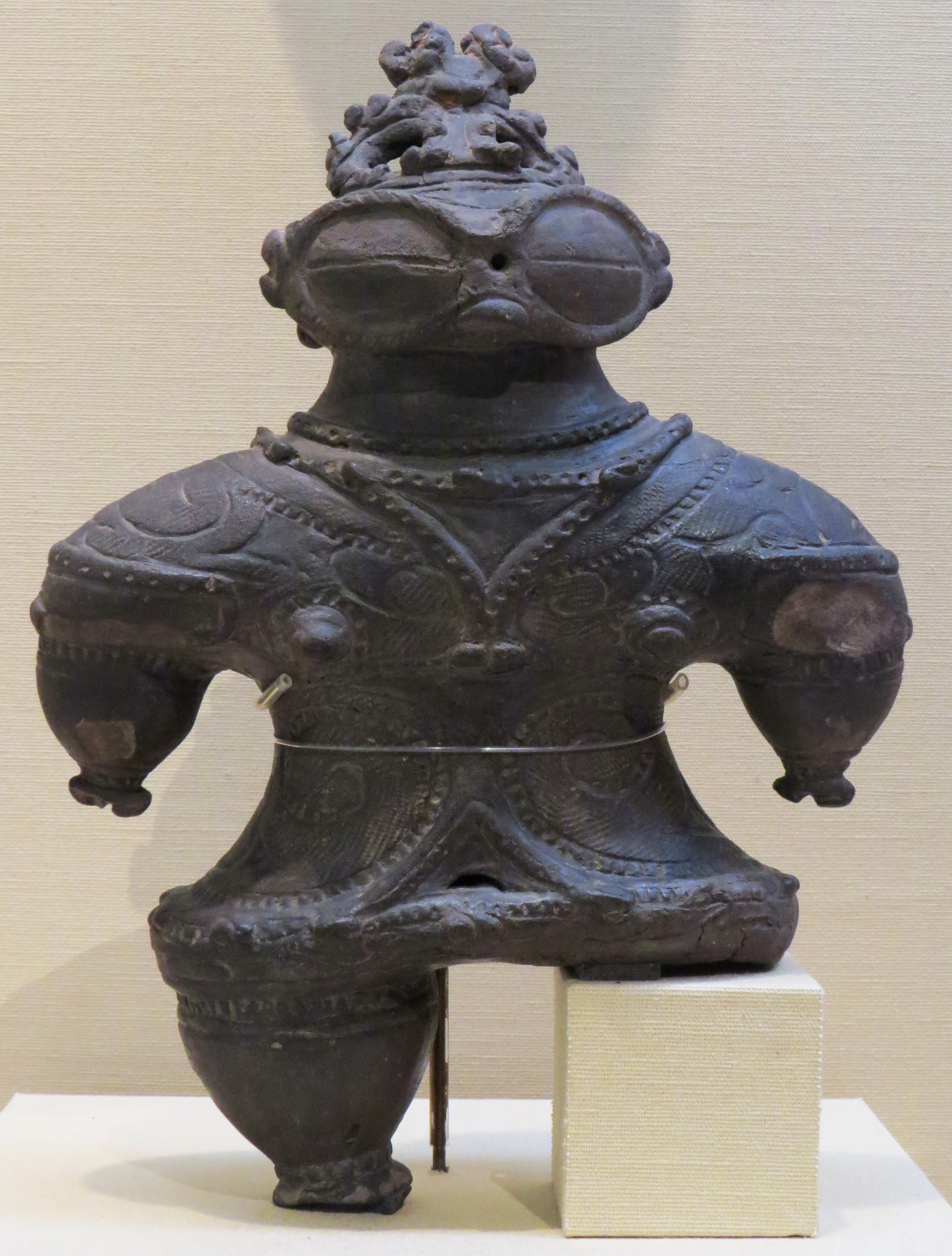
Dogū, or statuette in the late Jōmon period

Ancient Japanese clay figures are known as dogū (土偶) and haniwa (埴輪).

Early inhabitants of the Japanese archipelago evolved the first Japanese native art in rough earthenware and in strange clay figures called dogū, which are probably fetishes of some religious nature. Dogū may have been used in fertility rites, exorcism or other forms of ritual. The figures feature elaborate symbolism of strongly engraved lines and swirls.

The Nihon Shoki (Chronicles of Japan) which is an ancient history of Japan compiled in 720, states that haniwa was ordered at the time of an empress's death by the emperor who regretted the custom of servants and maids of the deceased following their master in death, and ordered that clay figures be molded and placed around the kofun burial mound instead of the sacrifice of living beings. Scholars doubt the authenticity of this story and contend that plain cylindrical clay pipes were the first haniwa forms, and that they were used in the manner of stakes to hold the earth of the burial mound in place. Later these plain cylindrical haniwa came to be decorated and to take various forms, including the shapes of houses and domestic animals as well as human beings. They have been found arranged in a circle around the mound, lending credence to the scholars' theory. However, the haniwa figures likely gained religious symbolism later, aside from their original practical purpose as stakes.

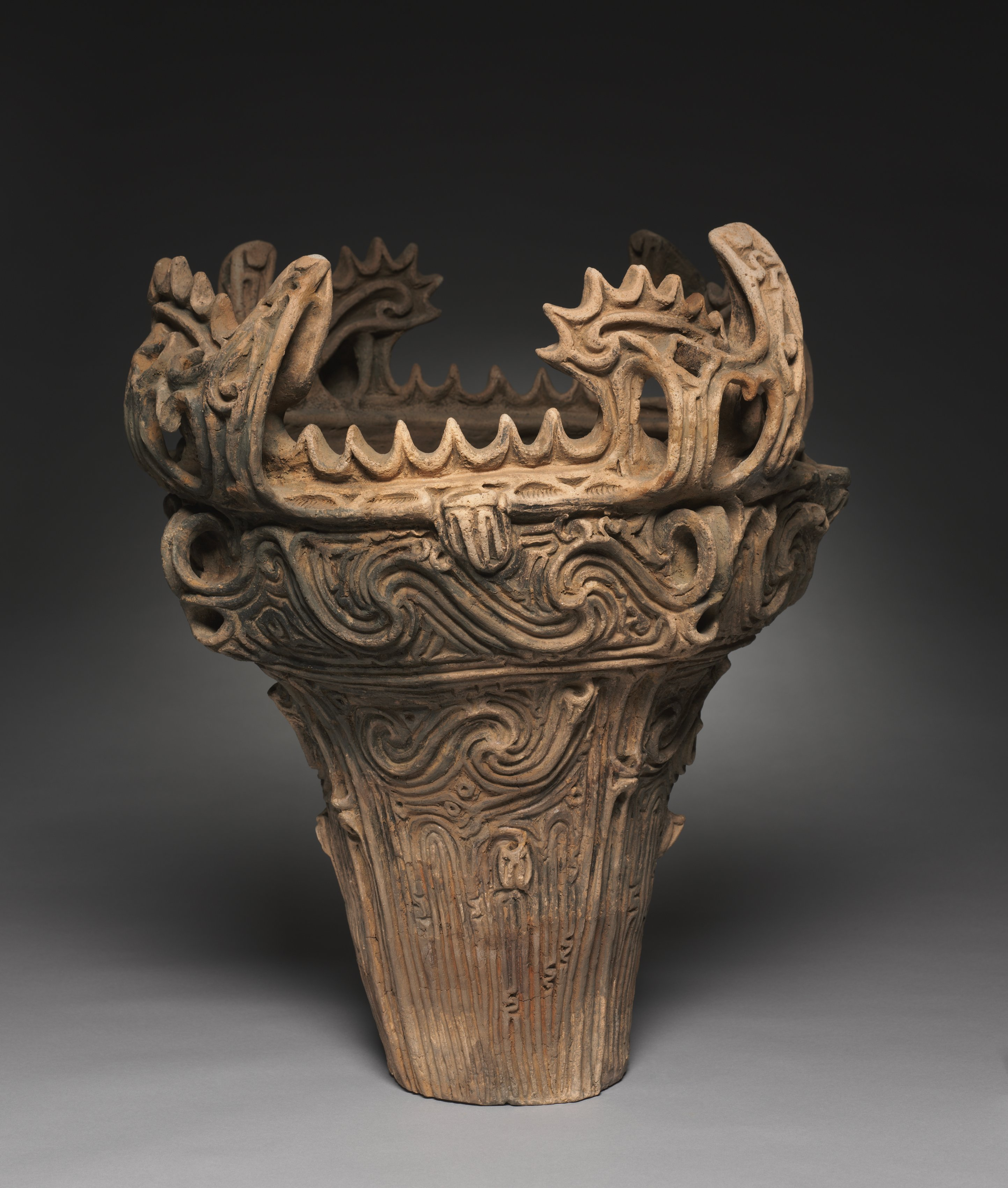
'Flame-style' vessel, Neolithic Jōmon period; c. 2750 BCE; earthenware with carved and applied decoration; height: 61 cm, diameter: 55.8 cm

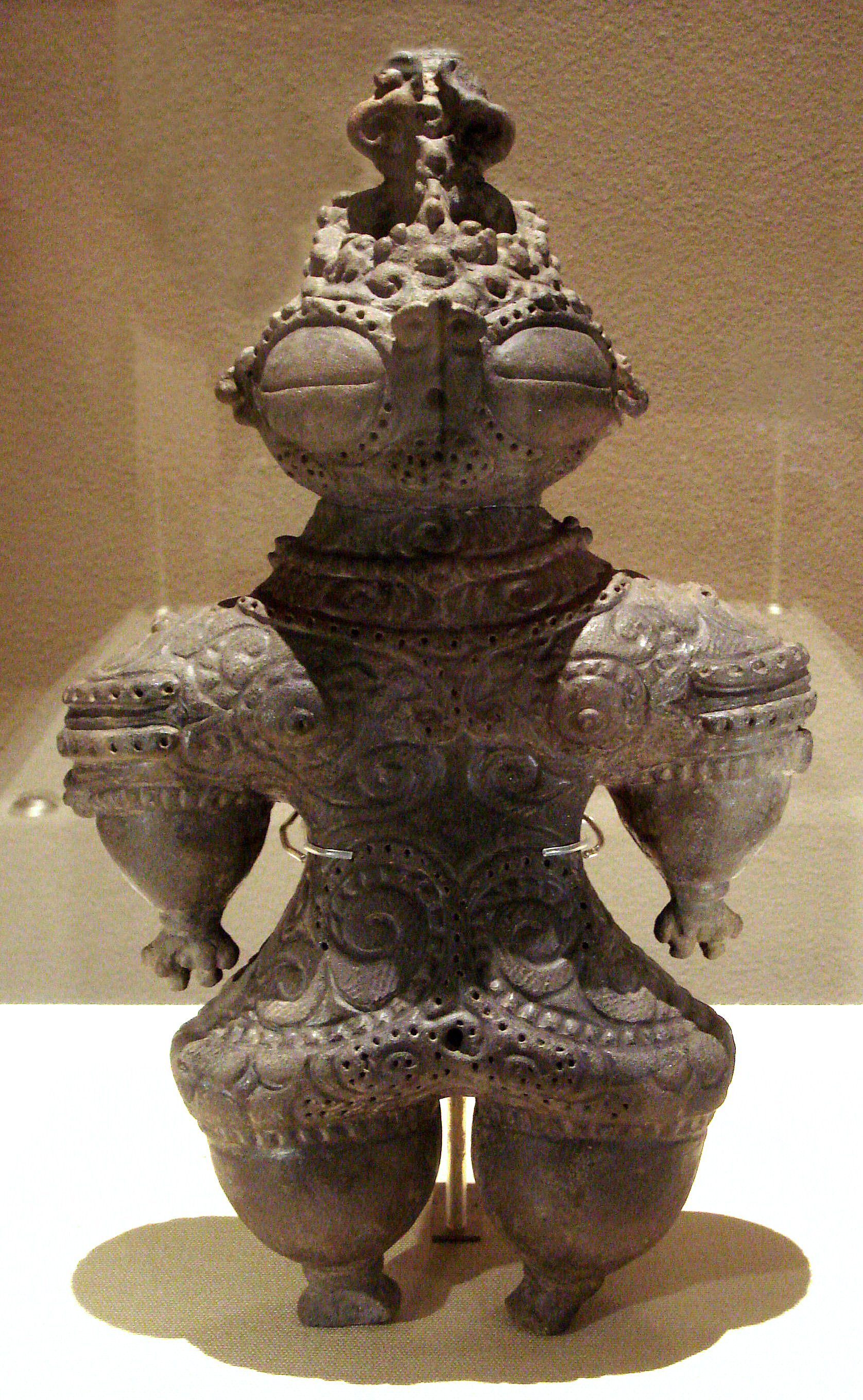
Dogū with "snow-goggle" eyes, 1000–400 BCE

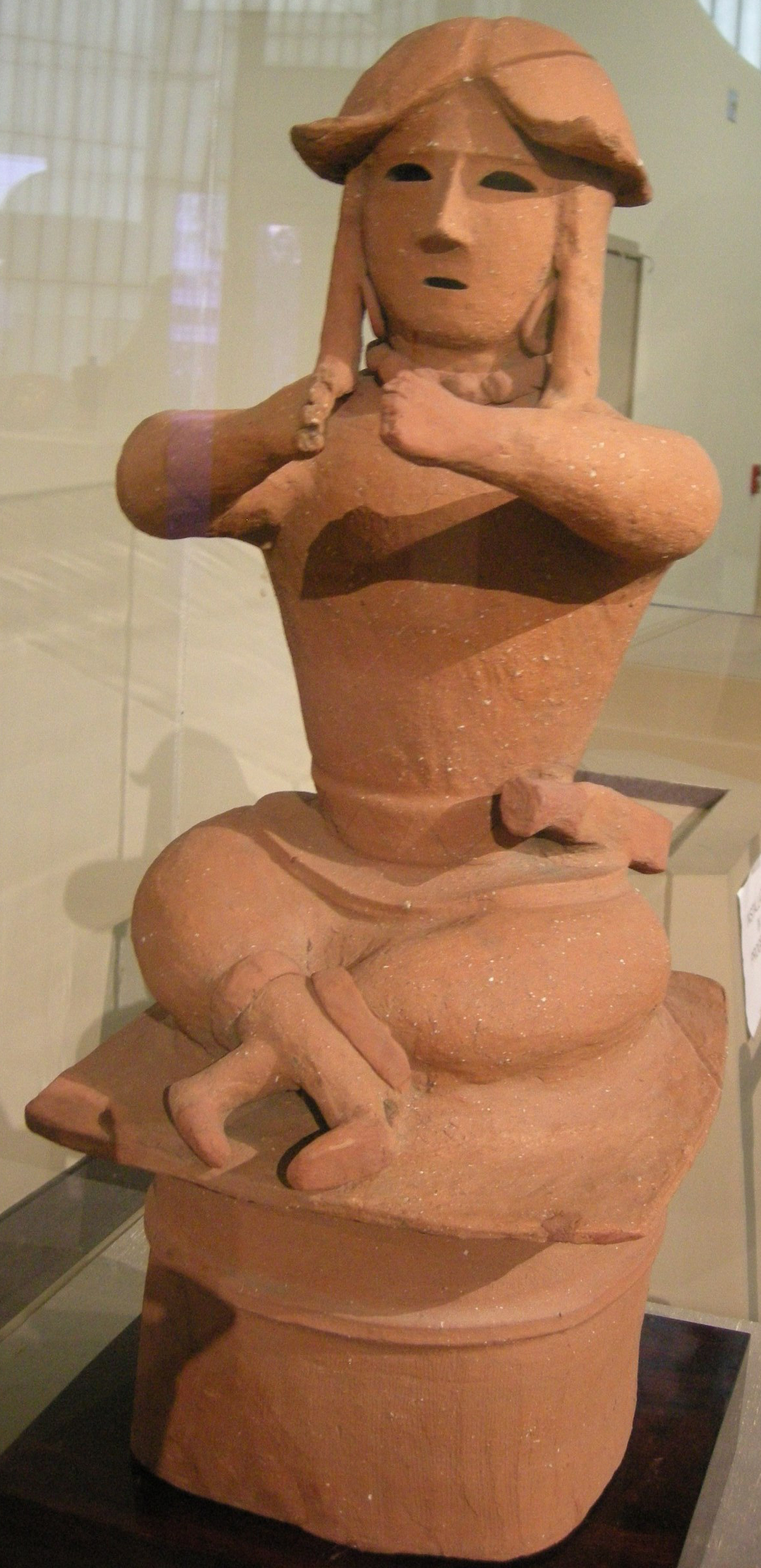
Haniwa figure

=== Asuka and Hakuhō periods ===
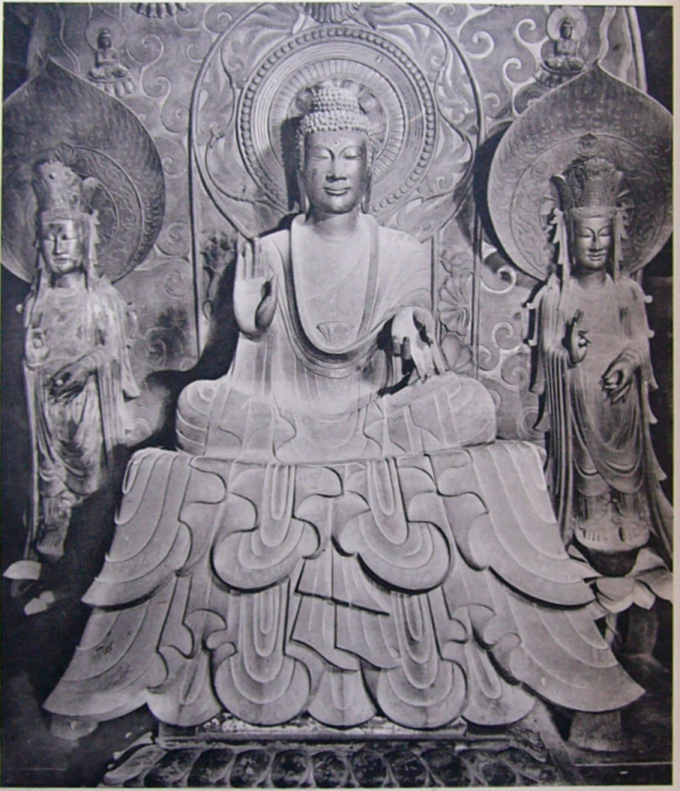
Shakyamuni Triad in Horyuji by Tori Busshi

Japanese emergence from the period of native primitive arts was instigated mainly by the introduction of Buddhism from the mainland Asian continent in the middle of the sixth century. Together with the new religion, skilled artists and craftsmen from China came to Japan to build its temples and sculpted idols, and to pass on artistic techniques to native craftsmen.

Earliest examples of Buddhist art may be seen at the seventh-century Horyū-ji temple in Nara, whose buildings themselves, set in a prescribed pattern with main hall, belfry, pagodas, and other buildings enclosed within an encircling roofed corridor, retain an aura of the ancient era, together with the countless art treasures preserved within their halls.

Nara and its vicinity contain the vast majority of the nation's treasures of the early period of Buddhist art, known in art history as the Asuka period. The sculpture of this period shows, as does most all subsequent sculpture, the influence of continental art. Noted Asuka sculptor Tori Busshi followed the style of North Wei sculpture and established what has come to be known as the Tori school of sculpture. Notable examples of Tori works are the Sakyamuni Triad which are the main icons of the Golden Hall of Horyū-ji temple and the Kannon Boddhisatva of Yumedono Hall of the same temple, also known as Guze Kannon.

Some of the most important Buddhist sculptures belong to the ensuing Hakuho art period when sculpture came to show predominantly Tang influence. The mystic unrealistic air of the earlier Tori style came to be replaced by a soft supple pose and a near-sensuous beauty more in the manner of the Maitreya, with long narrow slit eyes and gentle effeminate features, which in spite of their air of reverie have about them an intimate approachability. The aloofness of the earlier Asuka sculpture is softened into a more native form; and there is to be seen in them a compromise between the divine and the human ideal.

Representative sculptures of this period are the Sho Kannon of Yakushiji temple, and the Yumatagae Kannon of Horyū-ji, both showing the fullness of rounded flesh within the conventionalized folds of the garments, reflecting in their artistry features of the Gupta art are transmitted to Japanese through Tang.

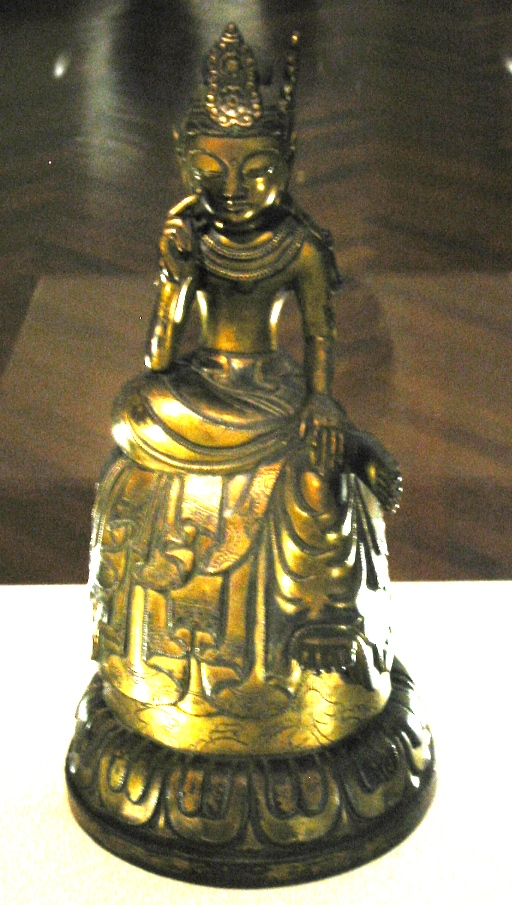
Bodhisattva, Asuka period, 7th century. Tokyo National Museum.

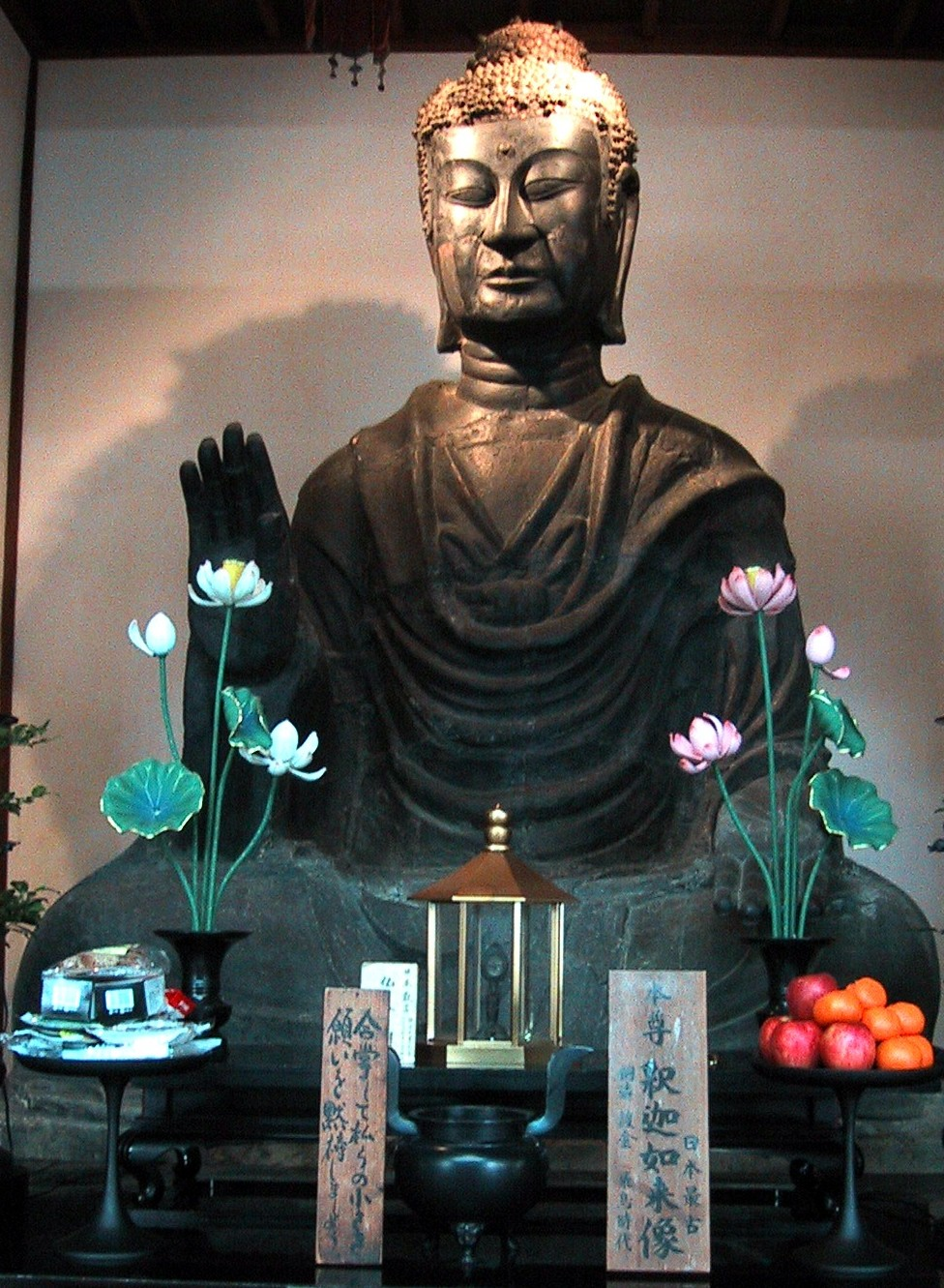
The Shakyamuni Daibutsu Bronze (4.8 metres) is the oldest known sculpture of Buddha in Japan cast by Tori Busshi in 609.

=== Nara period ===
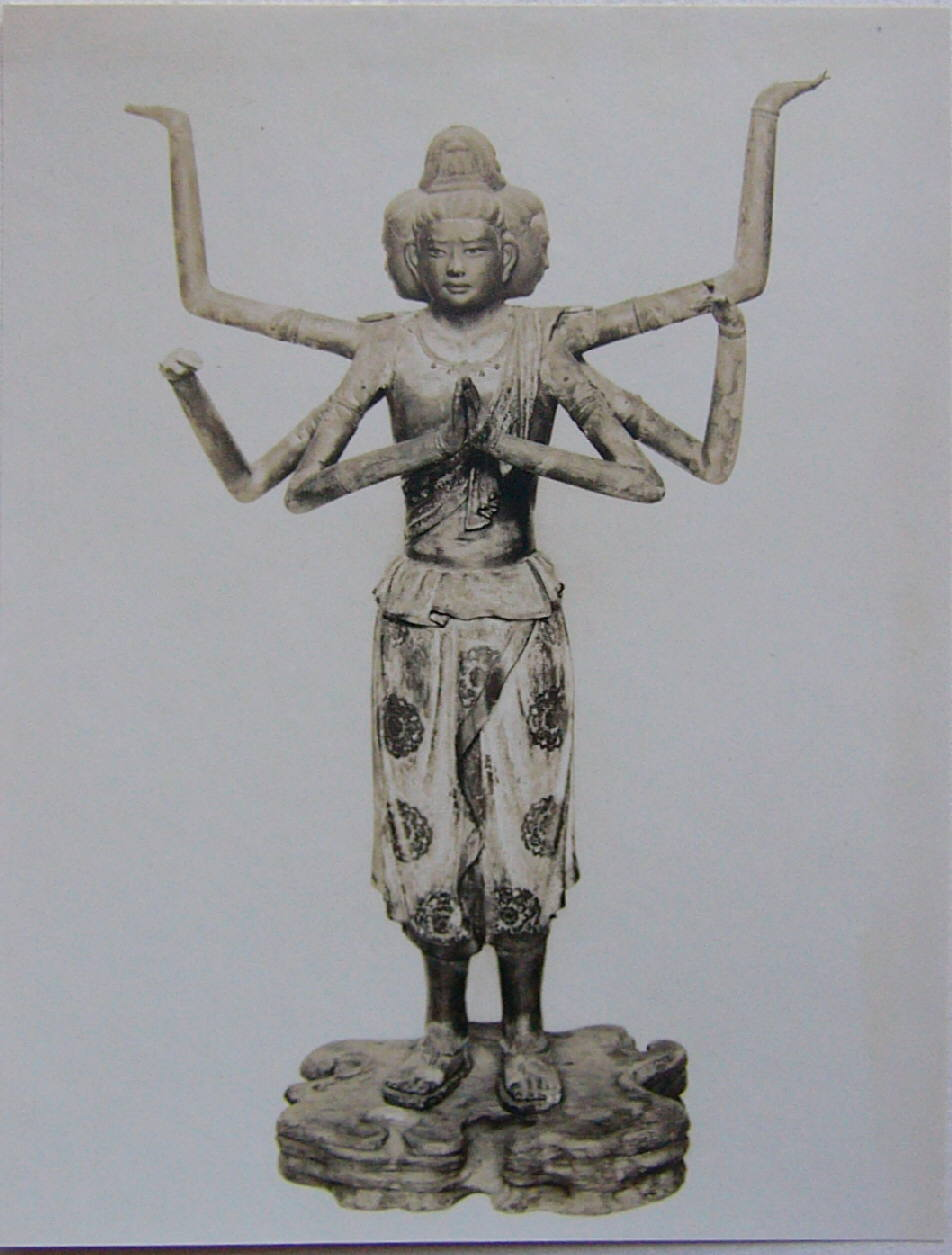
Asura, 733, Kōfuku-ji

In 710–793, Japanese sculptors learned high Tang style and produced a style called Tenpyō sculpture, which shows realistic face, massive solid volume, natural drapery, and representation of sentiment. Emperor Shōmu ordered the colossal gilt bronze Vairocana Buddha in Tōdai-ji temple, which was completed in 752.

Although the statue has been destroyed twice and repaired, a minor original part has survived. Among many original works, the Asura in Kōfukuji temple is a dry lacquer statue showing delicate representation of sentiment. The four guardians in Kaidanin, a division of Tōdai-ji temple, are clay statues. A national official factory, Zō Tōdai-ji shi ("Tōdai-ji Temple construction office"), produced many Buddhist sculptures by division of the work for Tōdai-ji and other official temples and temples for novelties. Gilt bronze, dry lacquer, clay, terracotta, repousee, stone, and silver sculptures were made in the factory. Generally the sculptors were secular and received official status and salary. Some private studios offered Buddhist icons to people, and some monks made them themselves.

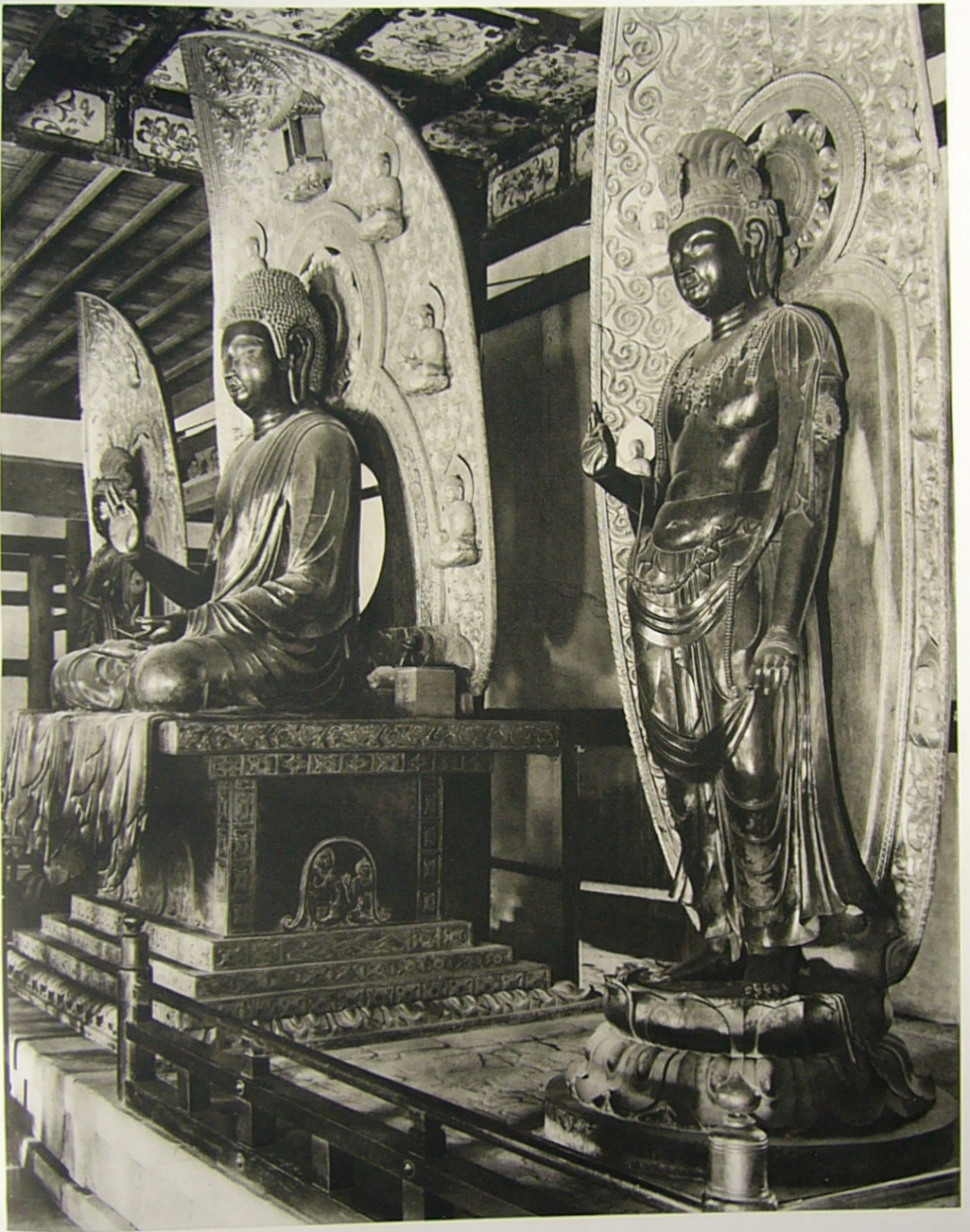
Triad of Yakushi at Yakushi-ji

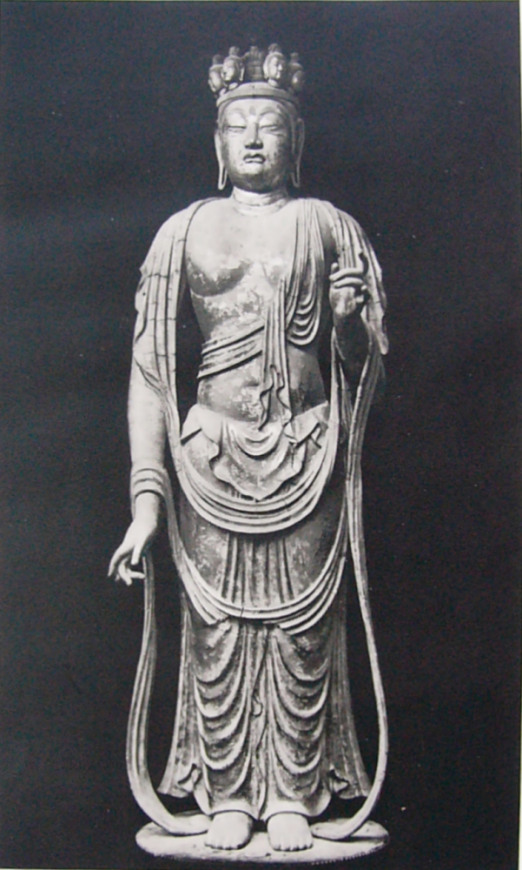
Jūichimen kannon. 8th century, Shōrin-ji in Nara

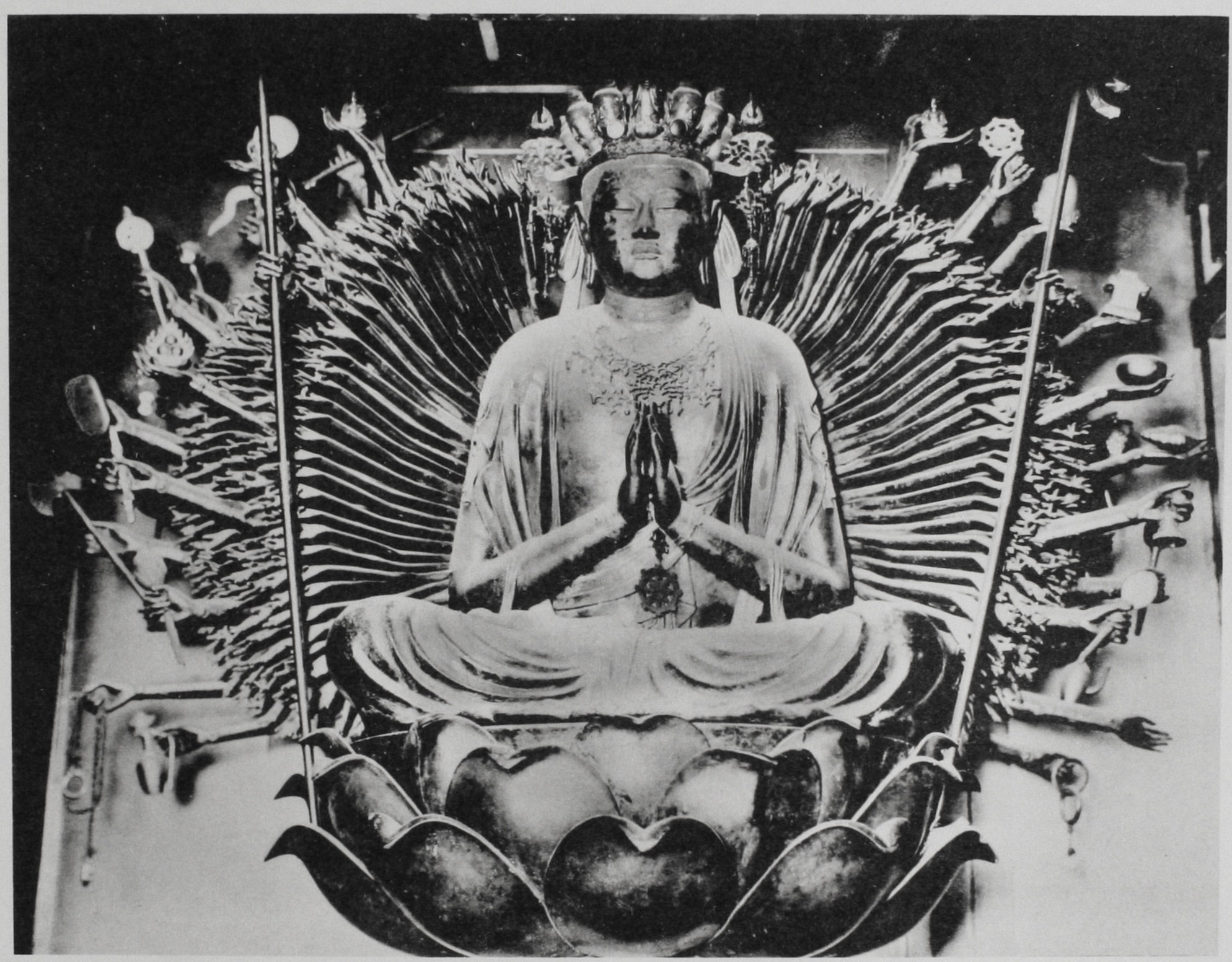
Senju Kannon of Fujii-dera in Osaka

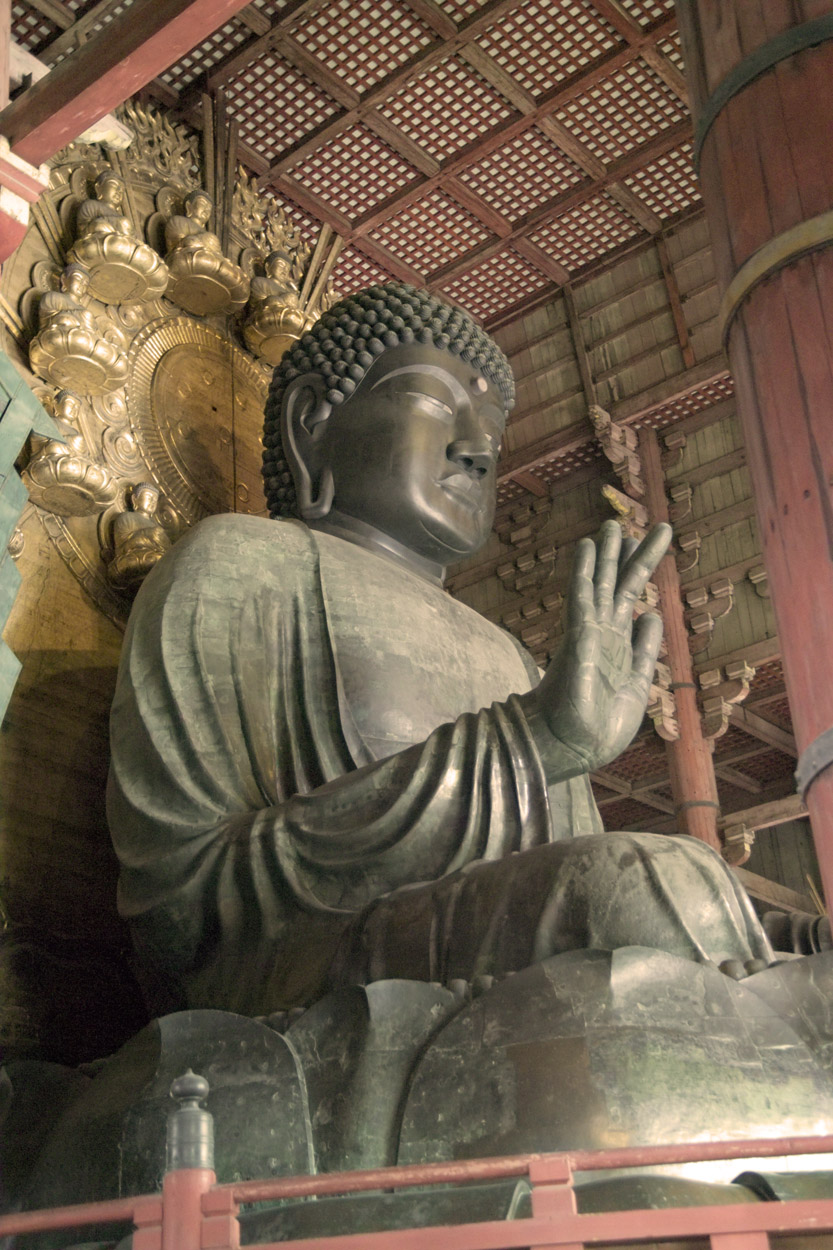
Great Buddha of Tōdai-ji in Nara

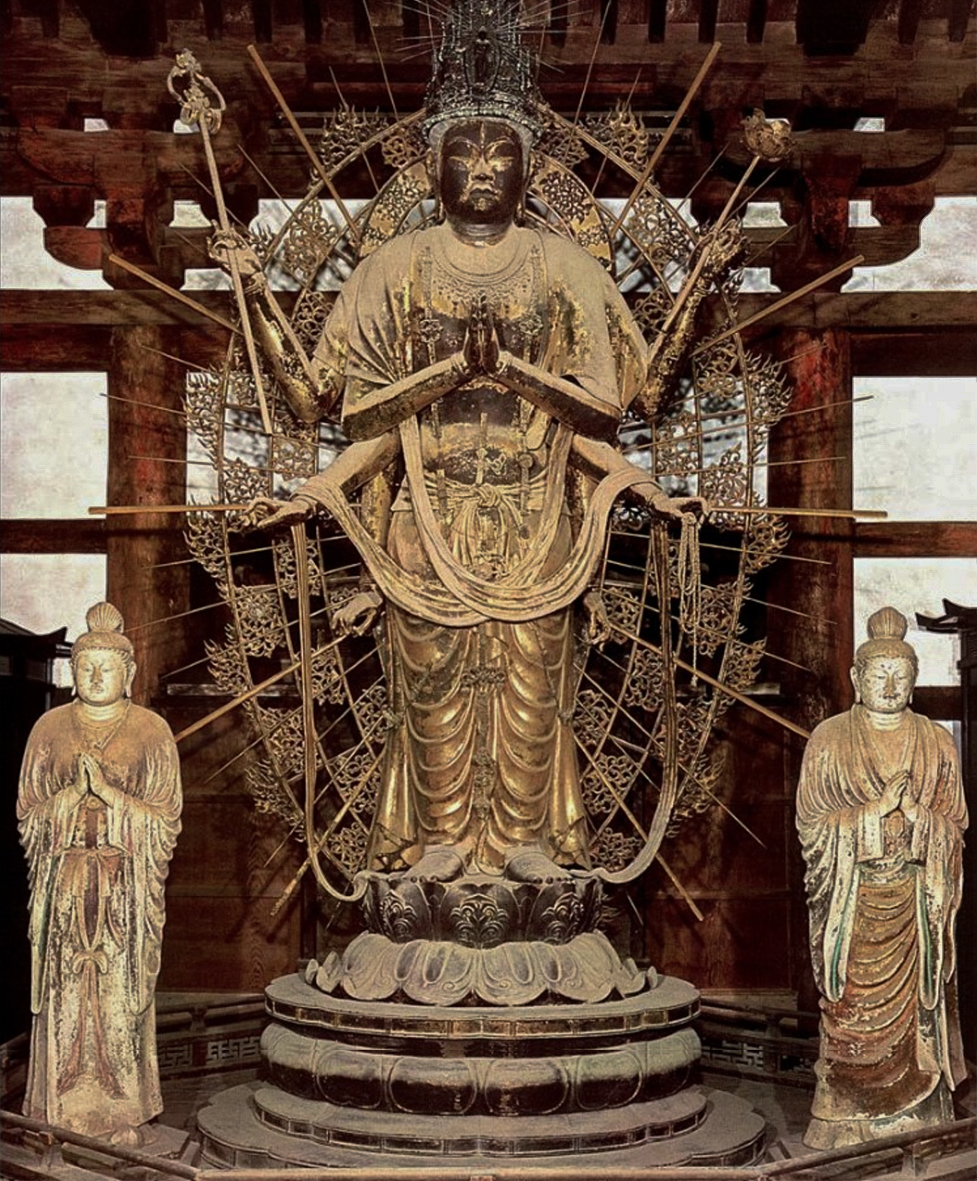
Fukū-kensaku Kannon of Hokke-do. Tōdai-ji in Nara

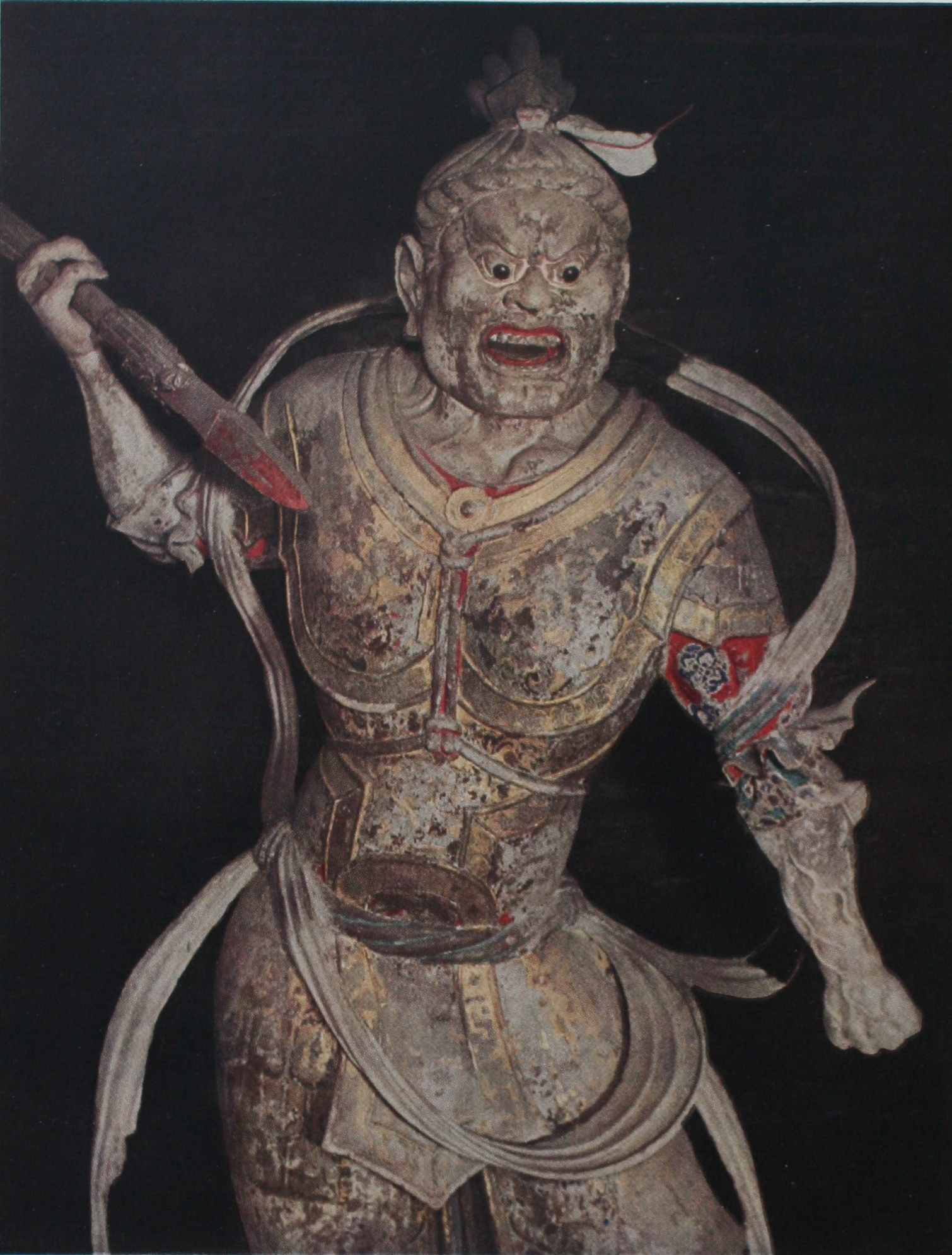
Shukongoshin. Tōdai-ji in Nara

=== Heian period ===
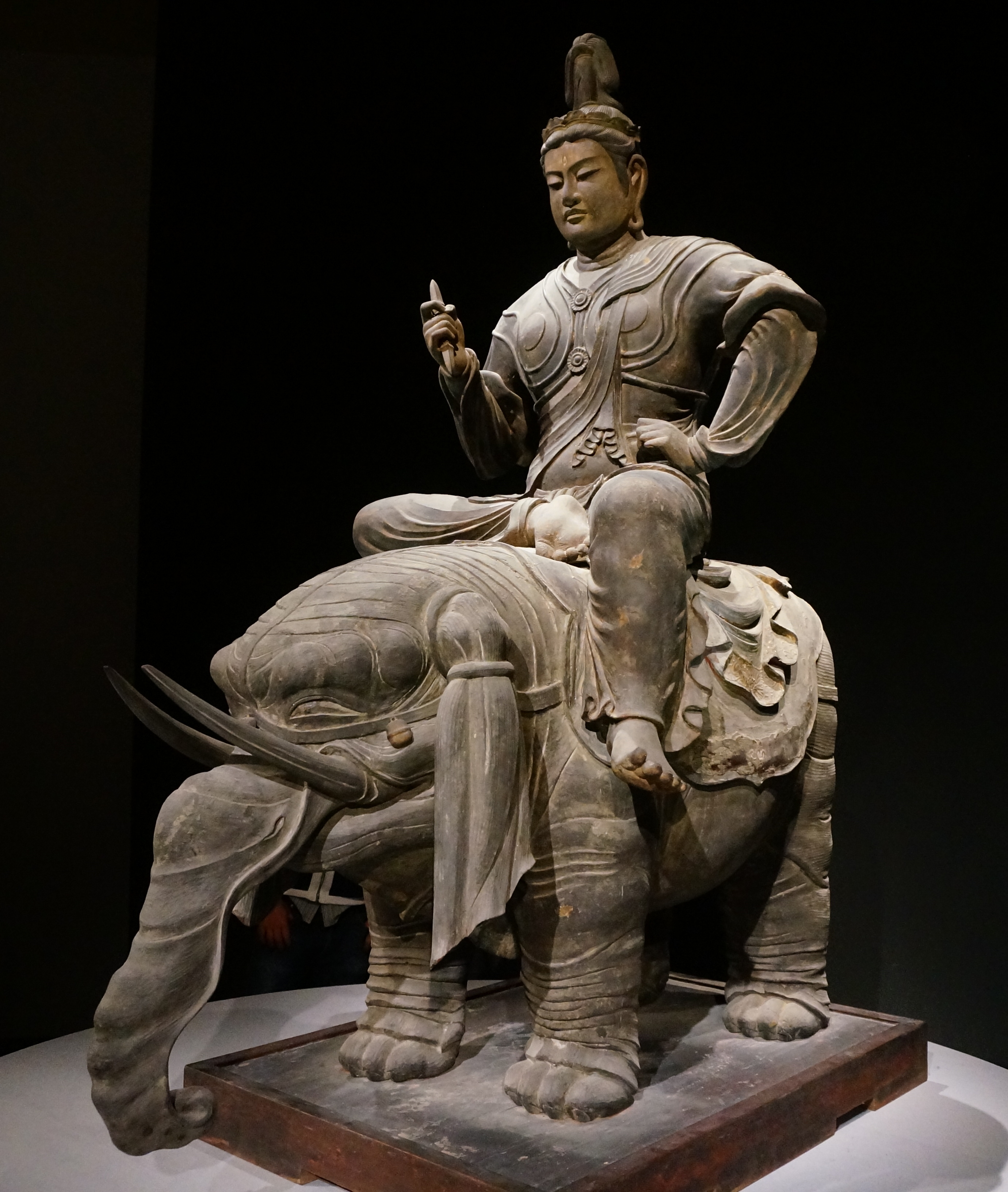
Taishakuten Śakra, 839, Tō-ji

With the moving of the imperial capital from Nara to Kyoto in 794, big temples did not move to Kyoto. The government fed new esoteric Buddhism imported from the Tang dynasty in China. The official factory Zo Tōdai-ji shi was closed in 789. The fired sculptors worked under the patronage of large temples in Nara, new temples of the esoteric sect, the court, and the novelties. Sculptors received temple clergy status whether or not they were members of the order. Wood became the primary medium.

Regarding the style, the Heian period was divided in two: the early Heian period and the later. In the early Heian period (794 to about the mid-10th century), esoteric Buddhist statues flourished. Kūkai, Saichō and other members of Imperial Japanese embassies to China imported the high to later Tang style. The statue bodies were carved from single blocks of wood and appear imposing, massive, and heavy when compared to Nara-period works. Their thick limbs and severe, almost brooding facial features imbue them with a sense of dark mystery and inspire awe in the beholder, in keeping with the secrecy of esoteric Buddhist rites. Heavily carved draperies, in which rounded folds alternate with sharply cut folds, are typical of the period. Among esoteric Buddhist deities, enormous images of Acala have been produced by the Japanese.

In the later Heian period (the mid-10th century to the 12th century), the sophistication of court culture and popularity of Amida Worship gave rise to a new style: gentle, calm, and refined features with more attenuated proportion. Sculptors Japanized faces of images. Pure Land sect (Amida Worship) leader Genshin and his work Ōjōyōshū influenced many sculptors. The masterpiece is the Amida Buddha in Byōdō-in in Uji by the master Jōchō. He established a canon of Buddhist sculpture. He was called the expert of yosegi zukuri technique: sculptors began working with multiple blocks of wood, too. This technique allowed masters atelier production with apprentices. In school, a grandson of Jōchō established an atelier which worked with the Imperial Court in Kyoto. En school a discipline of Jōchō, also established Sanjyō-Atlier in Kyoto.

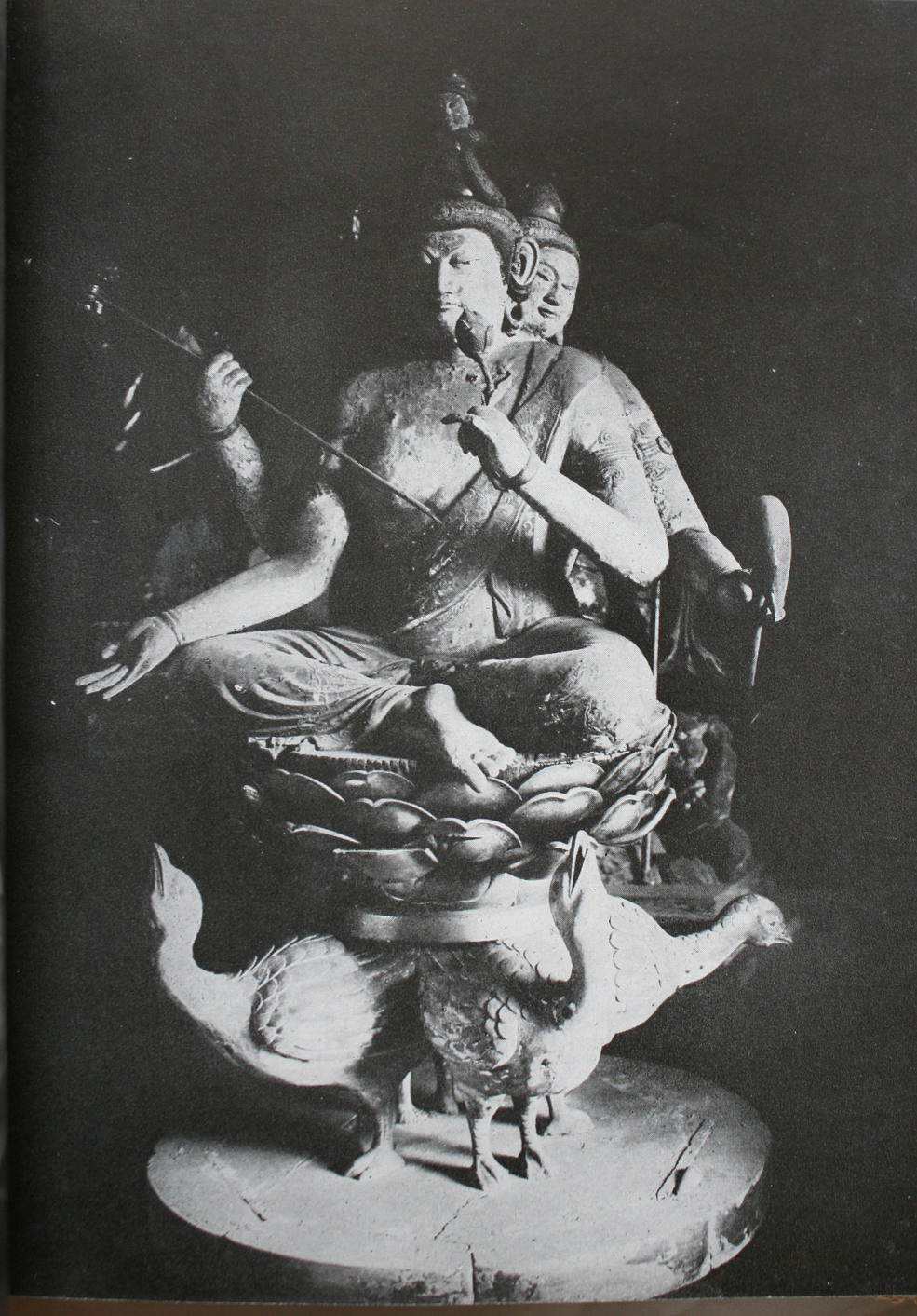
Bonten in Tō-ji. 839

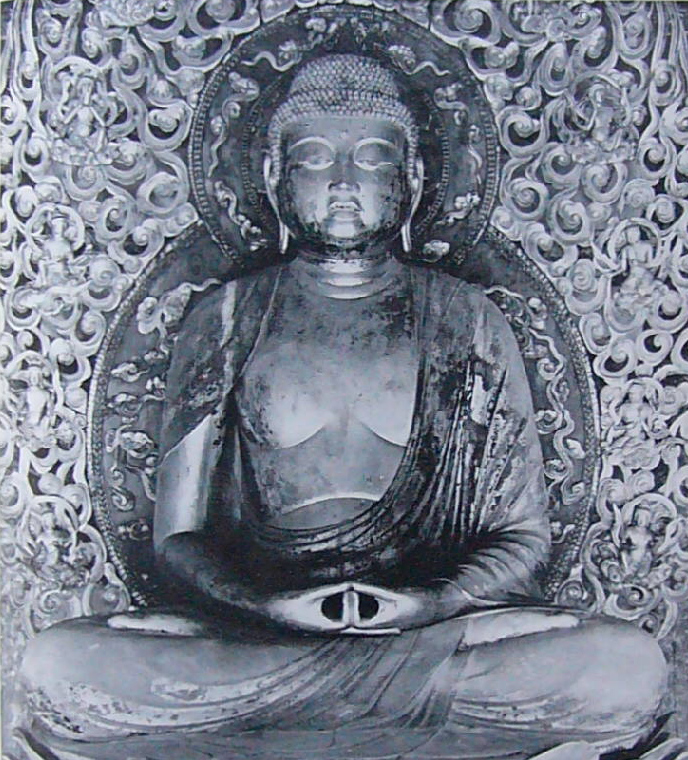
Amitābha in Byōdō-in created by Jōchō. 1053.

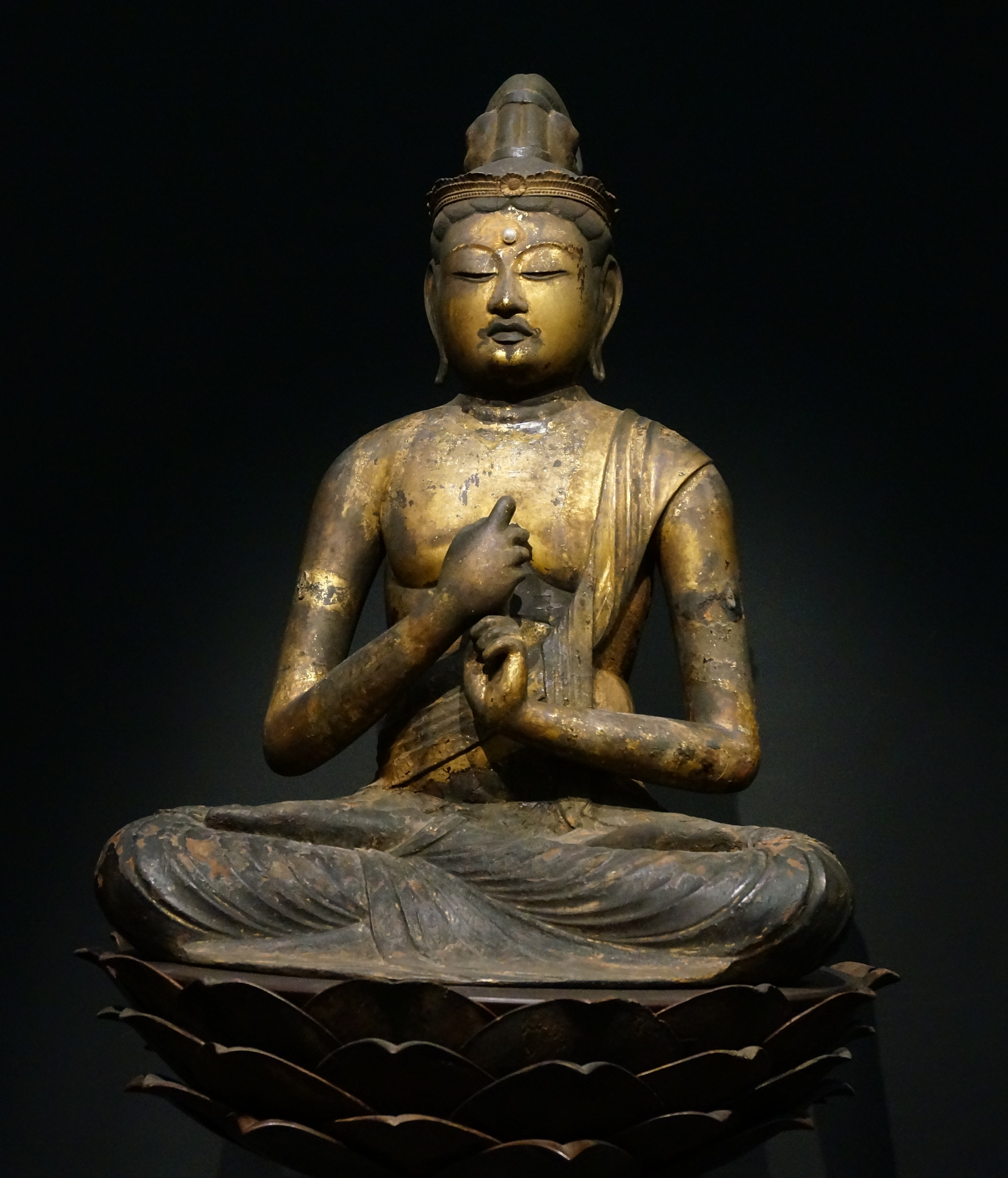
A gilt-wood statue of Vairocana Buddha, 11th-12th century

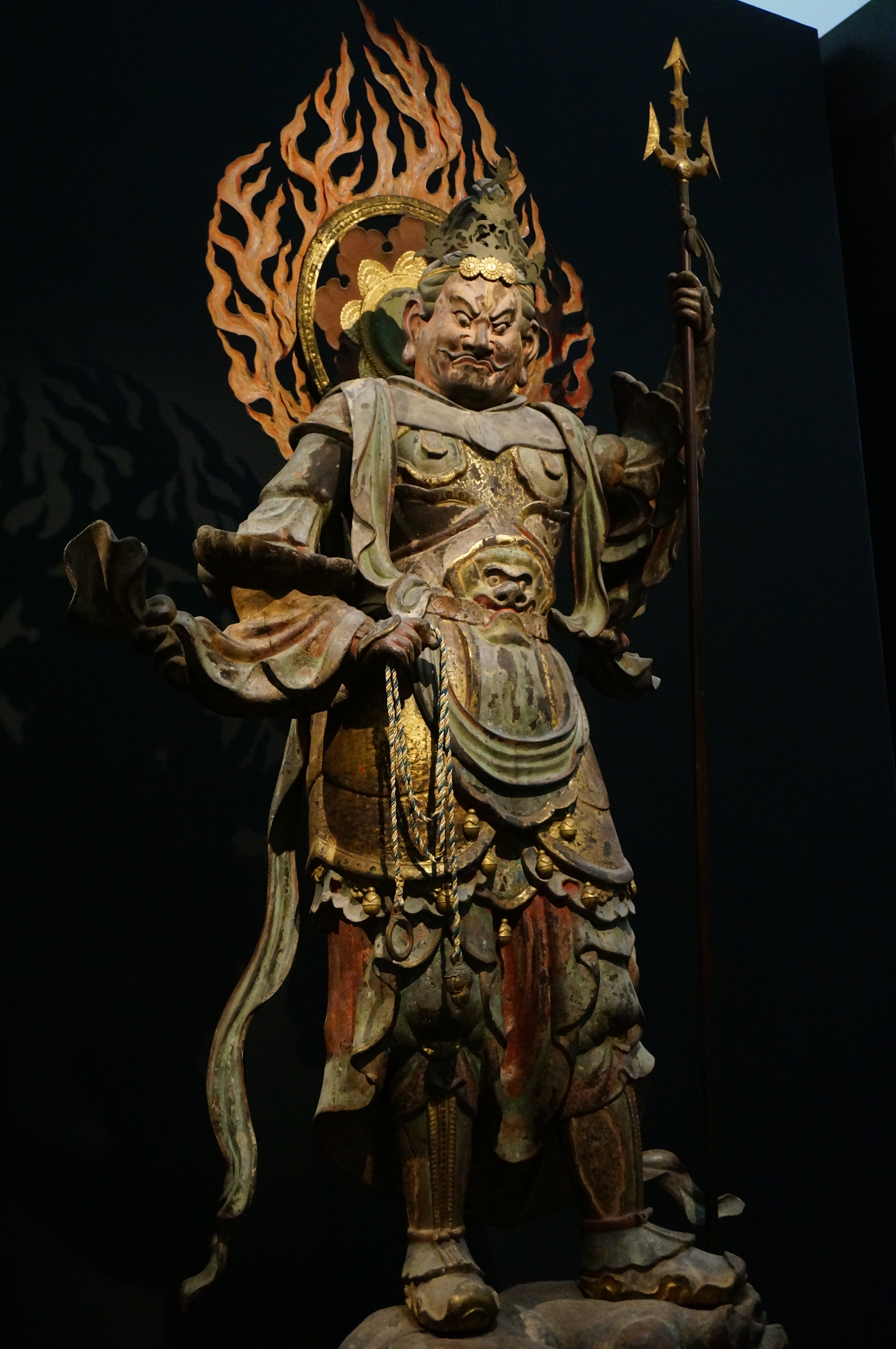
Statue of Komokuten (Virūpākṣa). Jōruri-ji, 11th-12th century.

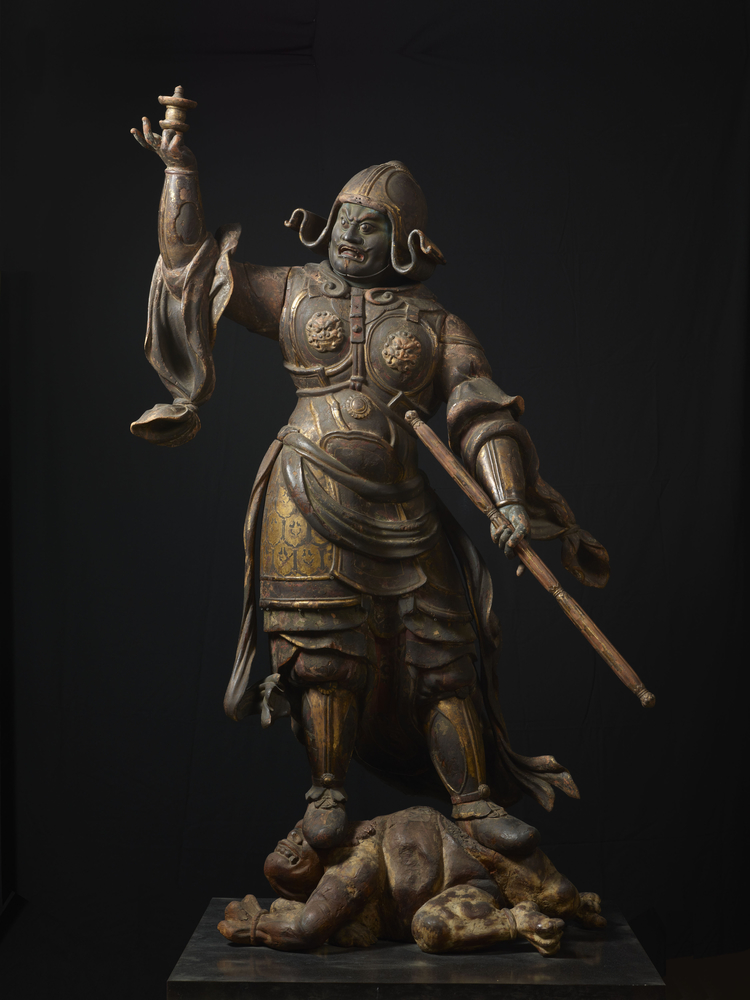
Statue of Tamonten (Vaiśravaṇa), Nara National Museum, 11th-12th century, late Heian or early Kamakura period

=== Kamakura period ===
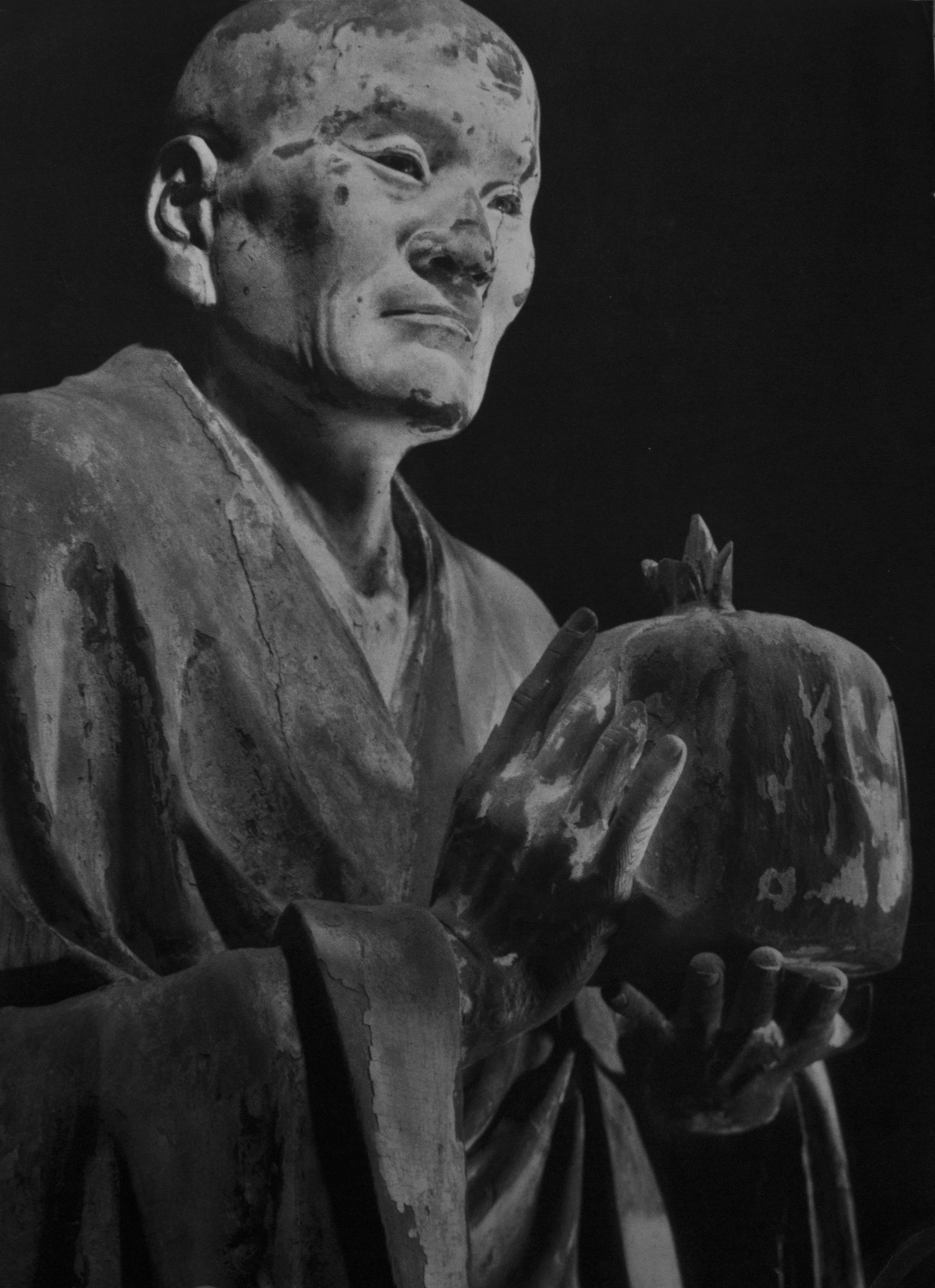
Muchaku by Unkei, Kōfuku-ji, 1212, National Treasure

Kei school established a new style of Buddhist sculpture based on realism, incorporating elements of the Tenpyo style of the Nara period as well as the yosegi-zukuri technique established by Jōchō in the Heian period. Their sculptures are characterized by sharp and stern expressions, muscular and three-dimensional bodies, and postures and clothing that express movement. The Kei school succeeded in expressing complex emotions and movements. This realism reflected the tastes of samurai, who had effectively governed Japan since the Kamakura period and had become new patrons of Buddhist sculptures. On the other side, clay, dry-lacquer, embossing, and terracotta sculptures did not revive. They used mainly wood and sometimes bronze.

The Kei school took root in Nara city, which was the former capital (710–793), and worked in large temples in Nara. In the Kamakura period, the Kyoto court and Kamakura shogunate military government reconstructed large temples burned in late-12th-century wars. Many sculptures were repaired and many buildings were rebuilt or repaired.

Among the sculptors of the Kei school, Unkei is renowned. His works include a pair of colossal Kongō-rikishi in Tōdai-ji and the portrait-like statues of Indian priests in Kōfuku-ji. Unkei had six sculptor sons and their work was also imbued with the new realism. Tankei, the eldest son and a brilliant sculptor, became the head of the studio. Kōshō, the fourth son, produced a remarkable sculpture of the 10th-century Japanese Buddhist teacher Kuya (903–972).

Kaikei was a collaborator of Unkei. He was a devout adherent of the Pure Land sect. He worked with the priest Chōgen (1121–1206), the director of the Tōdai-ji reconstruction project. Many of his figures are more idealized than those of Unkei and his sons, and are characterized by a beautifully finished surface, richly decorated with pigments and gold. More than 40 of his works have survived, many of which are signed by him. His most important work is the Amitabha Triad of Ono Jōdo-ji (1195).

One of the most outstanding Buddhist arts of the period was the statue of Buddha enshrined in Sanjūsangen-dō consisting of 1032 statues produced by sculptors of Buddhist statues of the Kei school, In school and En school. The principal image Senju Kannon in the center, the surrounding 1001 Senju Kannon, the 28 attendants of Senju Kannon, Fūjin and Raijin create a solemn space, and all are designated as National Treasures.

Sculptors also worked for the Kamakura shogunate and other military clans. They produced Buddhist and portrait sculptures for them. The colossal bronze Amitabha Buddha in Kamakura Kōtoku-in was made in 1252. All classes of society contributed funds to make this colossal bronze. Such community patronage upped the ante, and sometimes replaced, the patronage of wealthy and powerful individuals.

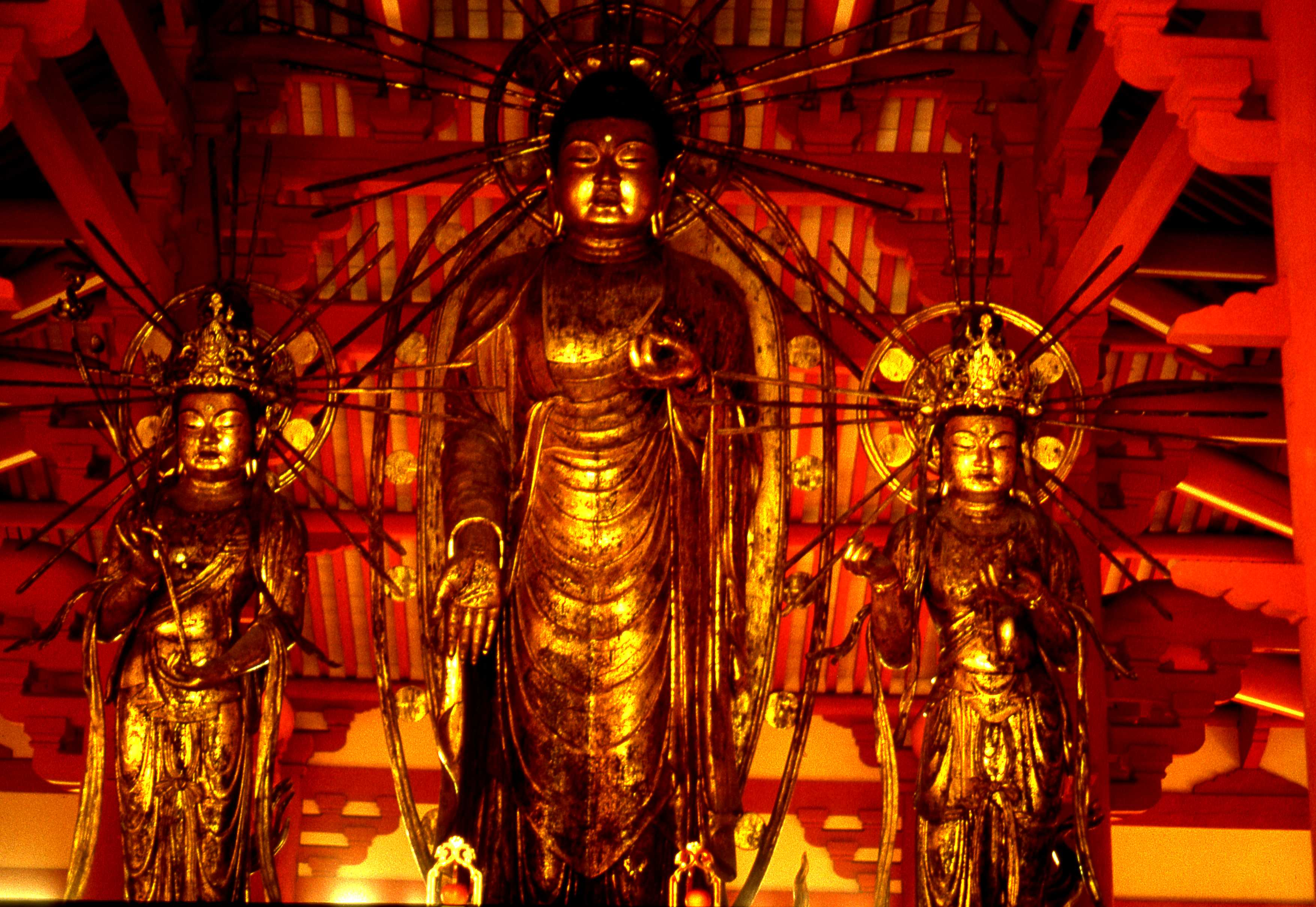
Amitābha by Kaikei. Jōdo-ji, 1195－1197.

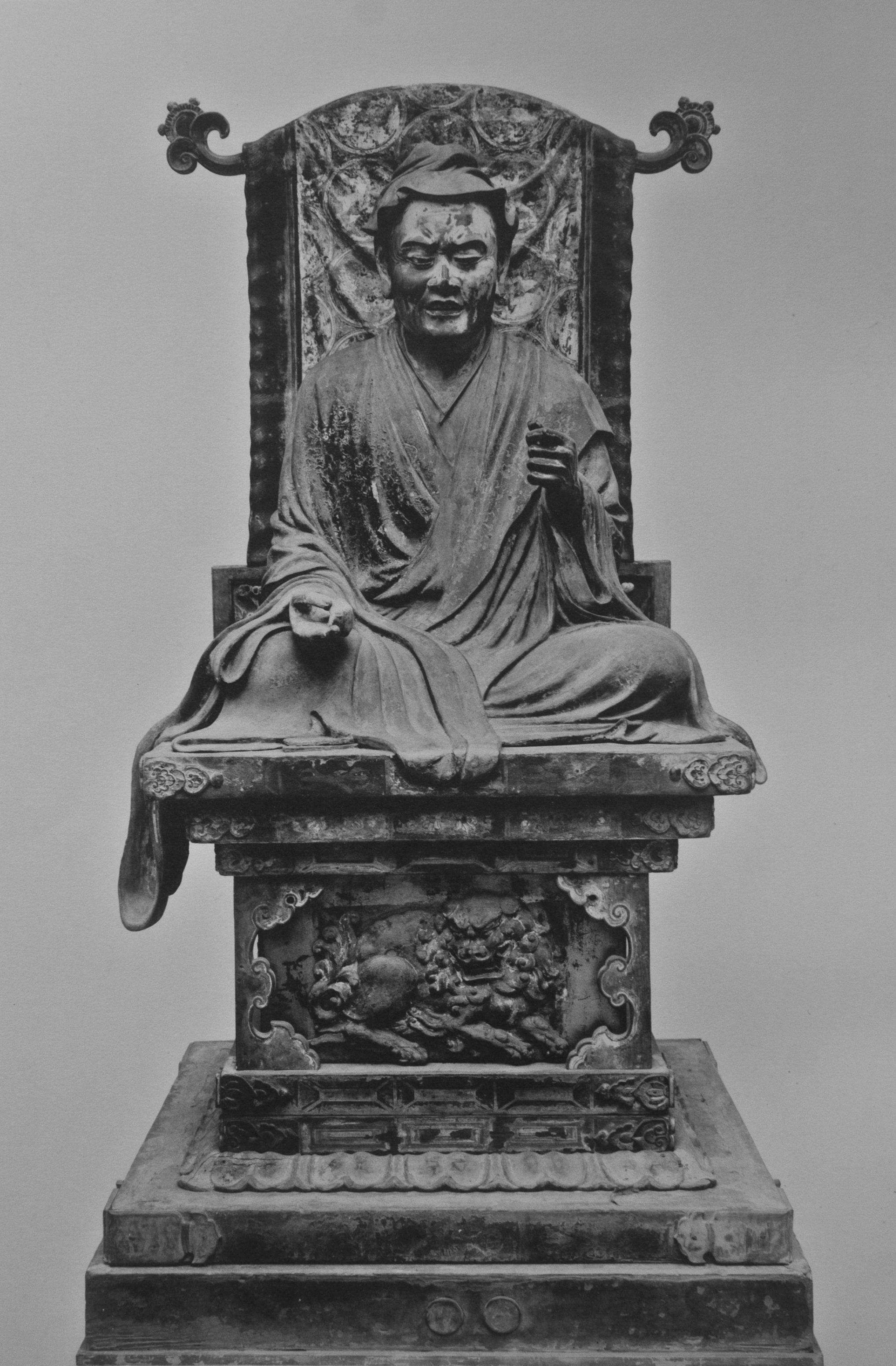
Yuima Koji/Vimalakirti by Jōkei, Kōfuku-ji, 1196, National Treasure

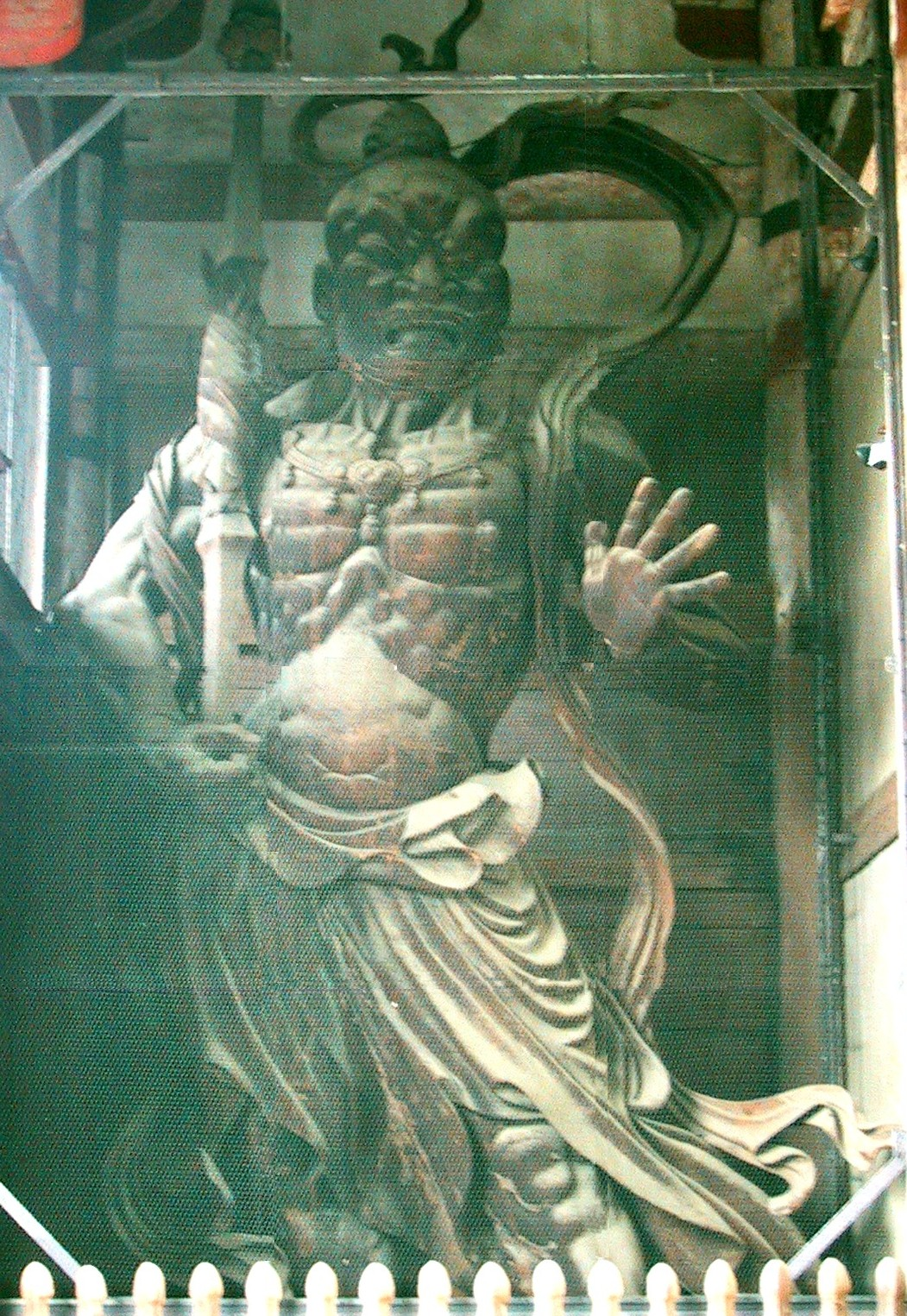
Nio guardian in Tōdai-ji, by Unkei, 1203

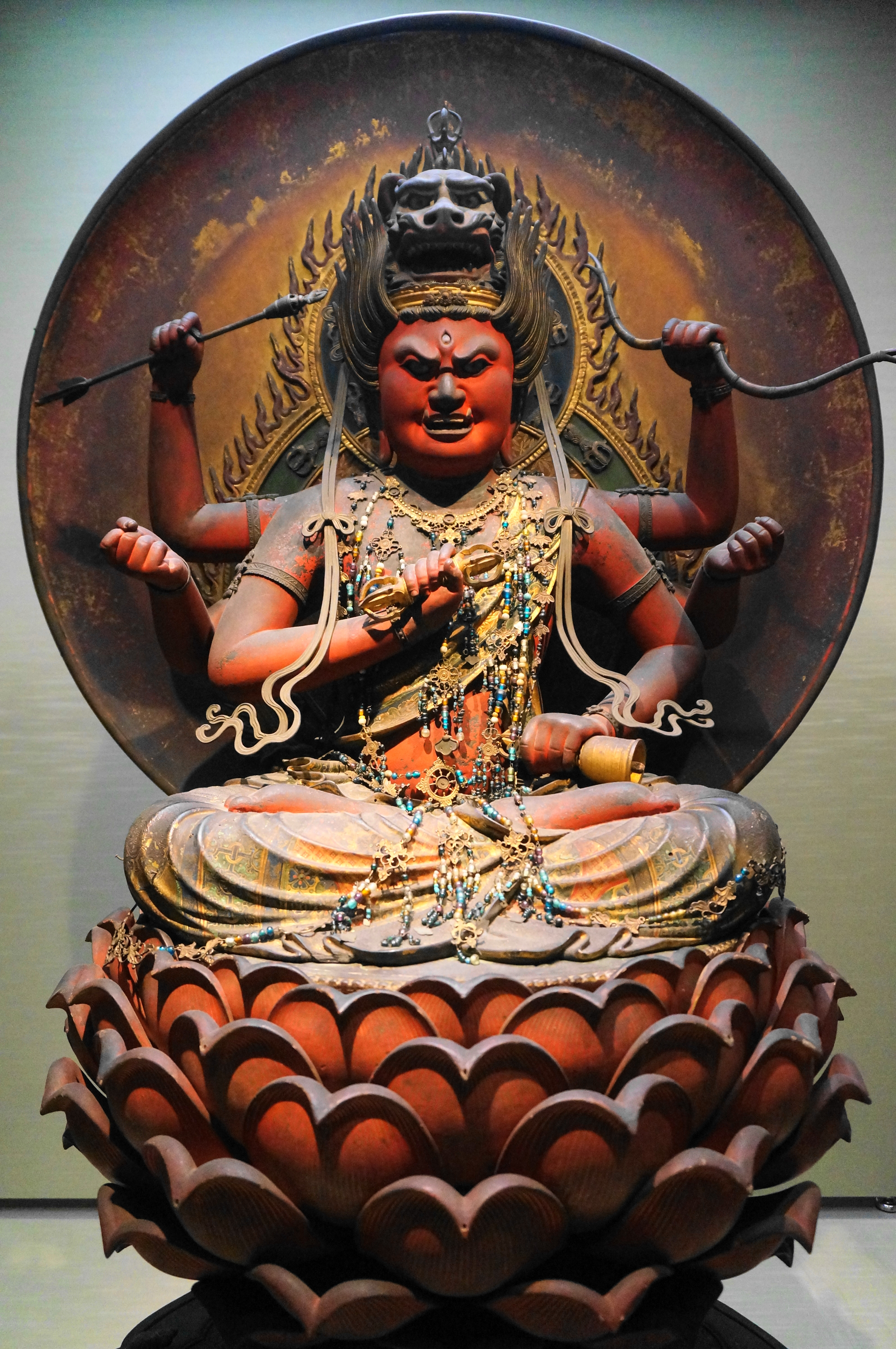
Aizen Myo'o (Ragaraja), CE13th century, Tokyo National Museum

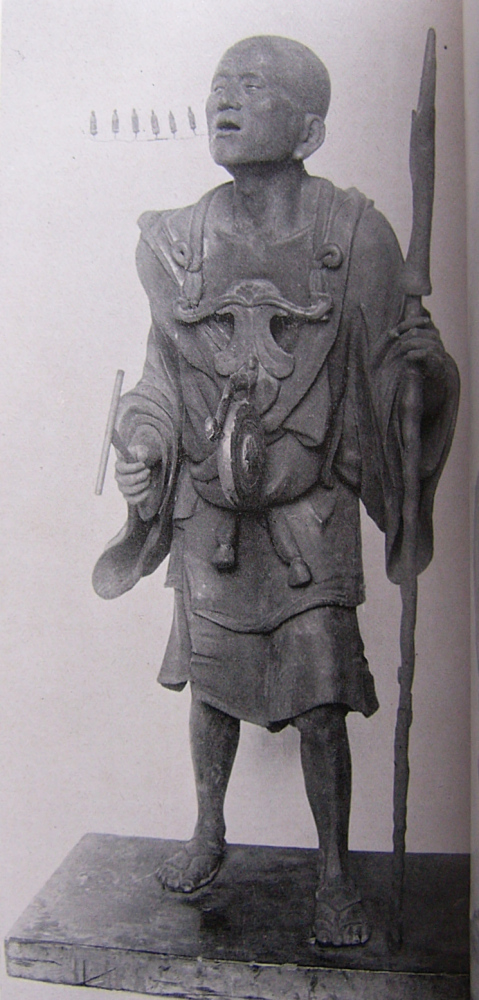
Portrait of monk Kūya (CE 930–972), total about cm height, wood, colored, CE13th century by Kosho

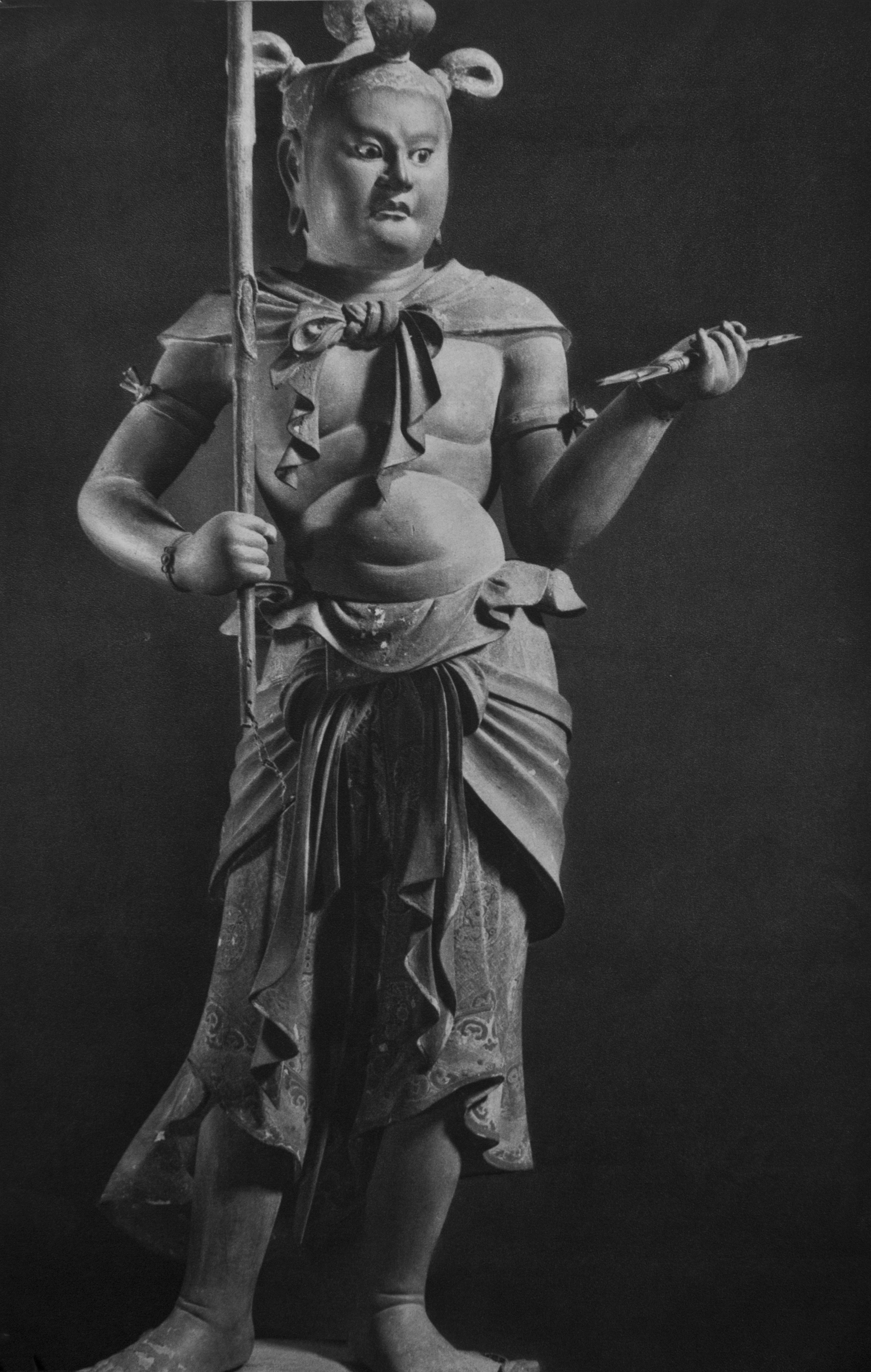
Seitaka Dōji by Unkei, Kongōbu-ji, National Treasure

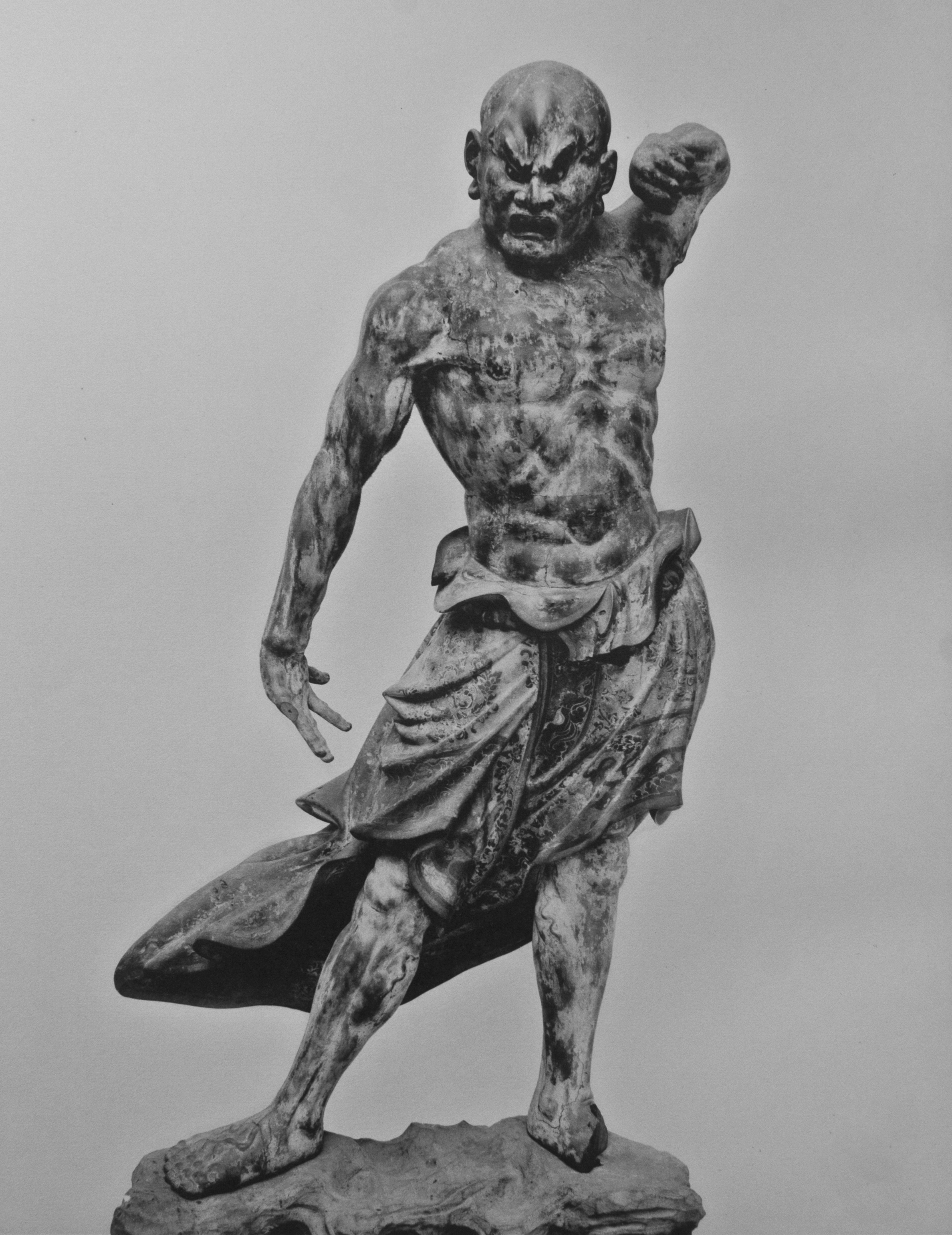
Kongō Rikishi, Kōfuku-ji, National Treasure

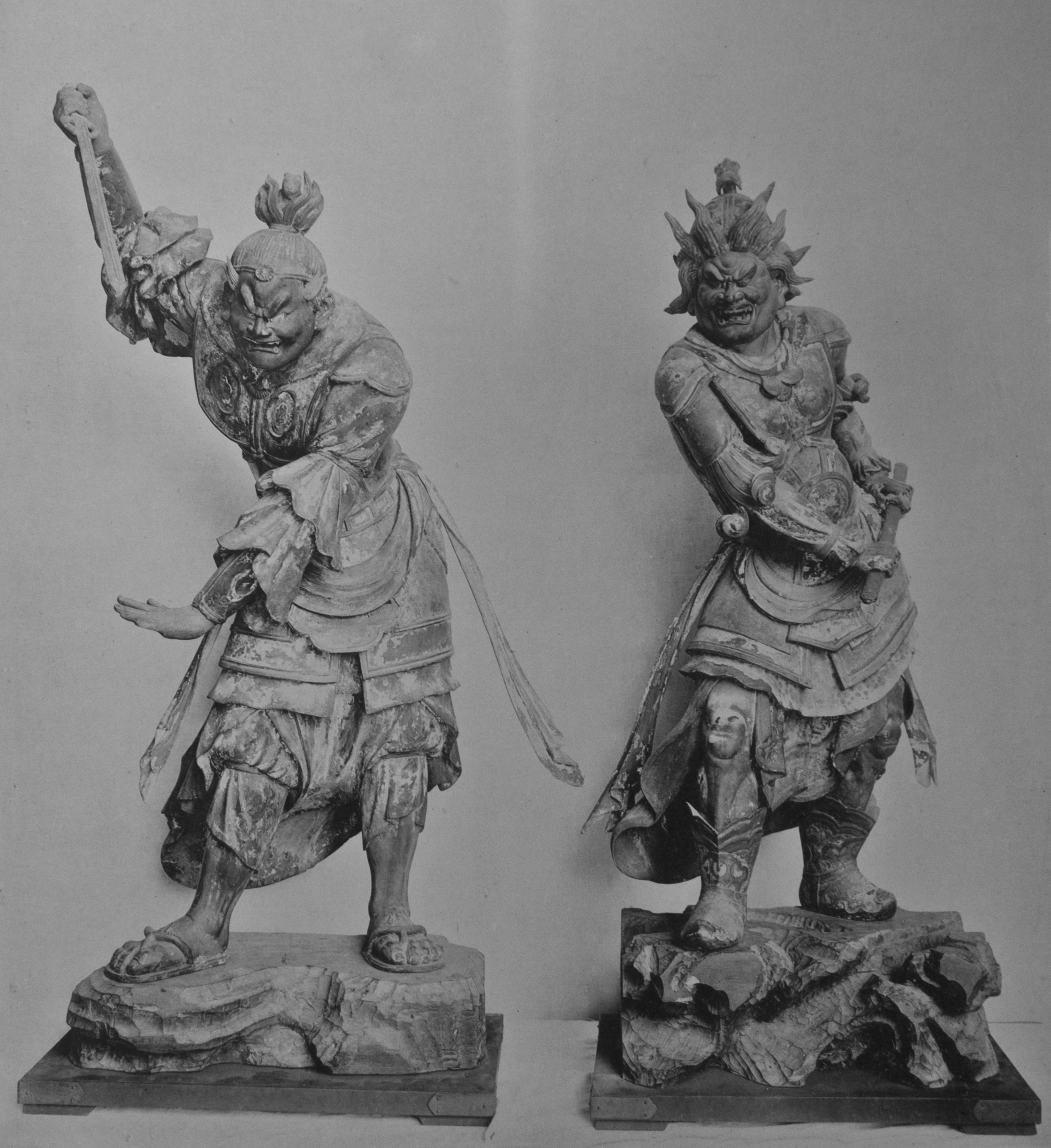
Twelve Heavenly Generals, Kōfuku-ji, 1207. National Treasure.

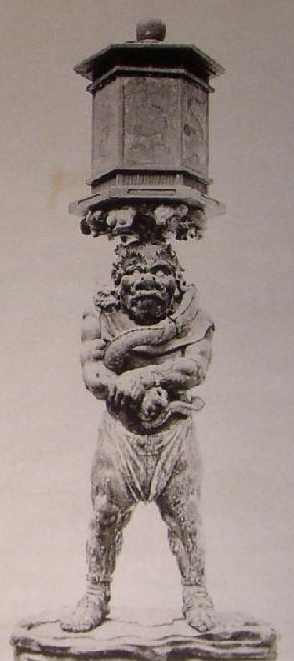
Ryūtōki by Kōben, Kōfuku-ji, 1215, National Treasure

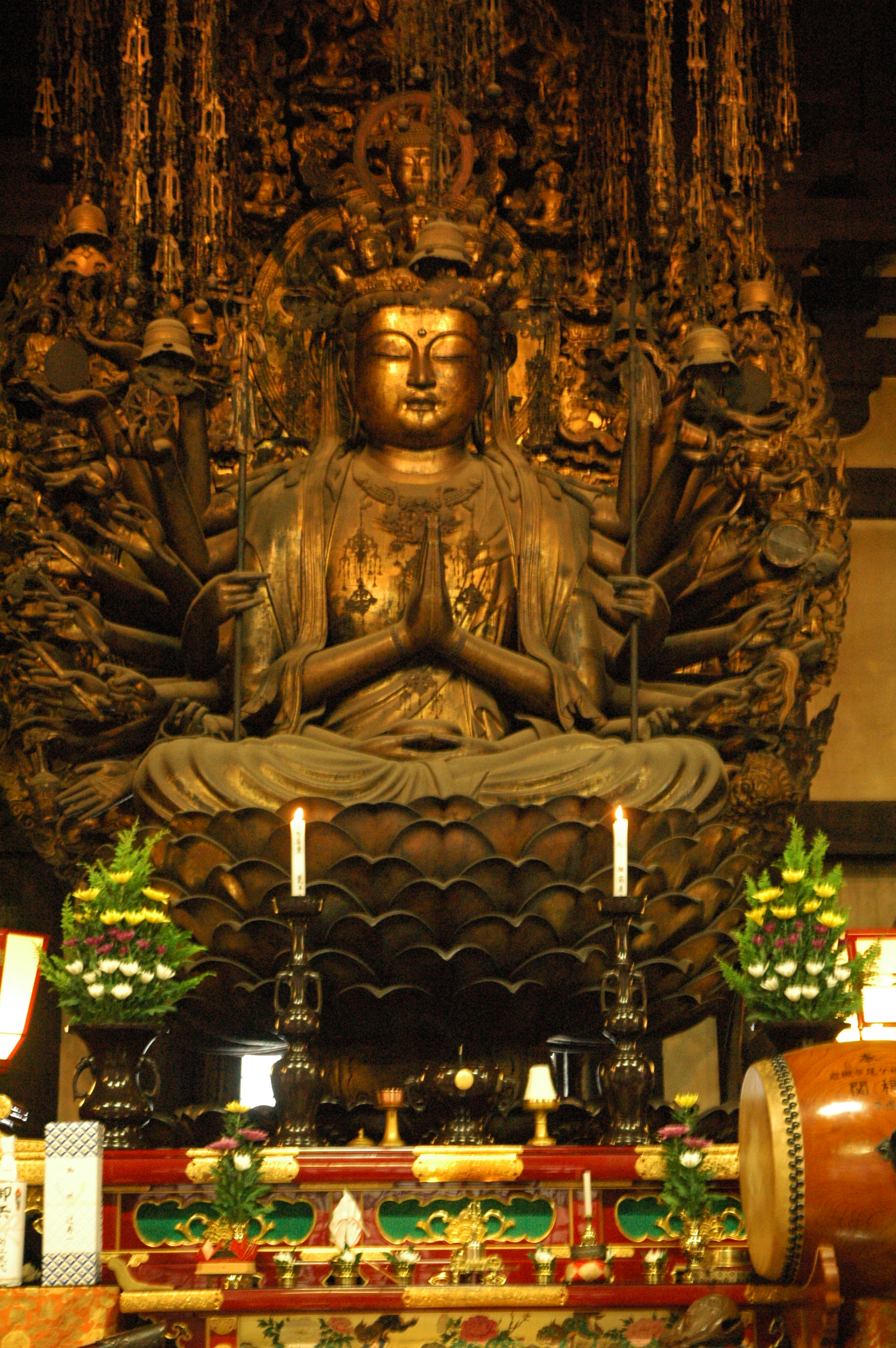
Senju Kannon by Tankei, Sanjūsangen-dō, 1254

Kamakura Daibutsu (Amida Buddha) at Kōtoku-in

=== Muromachi period and Sengoku period ===
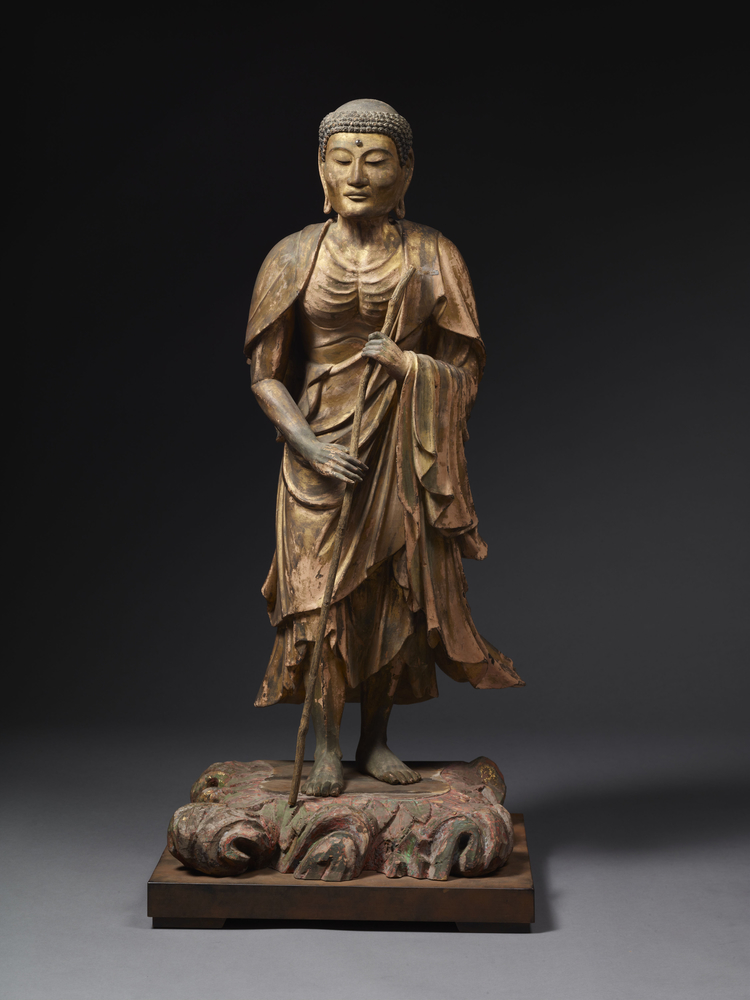
Śākyamuni coming out of the mountains. 15th-16th century. Nara National Museum

Buddhist sculptures declined in quantity and quality. The new Zen Buddhism deprecated images of Buddha. Big temples of the old sects were neglected during civil wars. Portrait sculptures of Zen masters became a new genre during this period. The art of carving masks for Noh theatre flourished and improved from the 15th to 17th centuries.

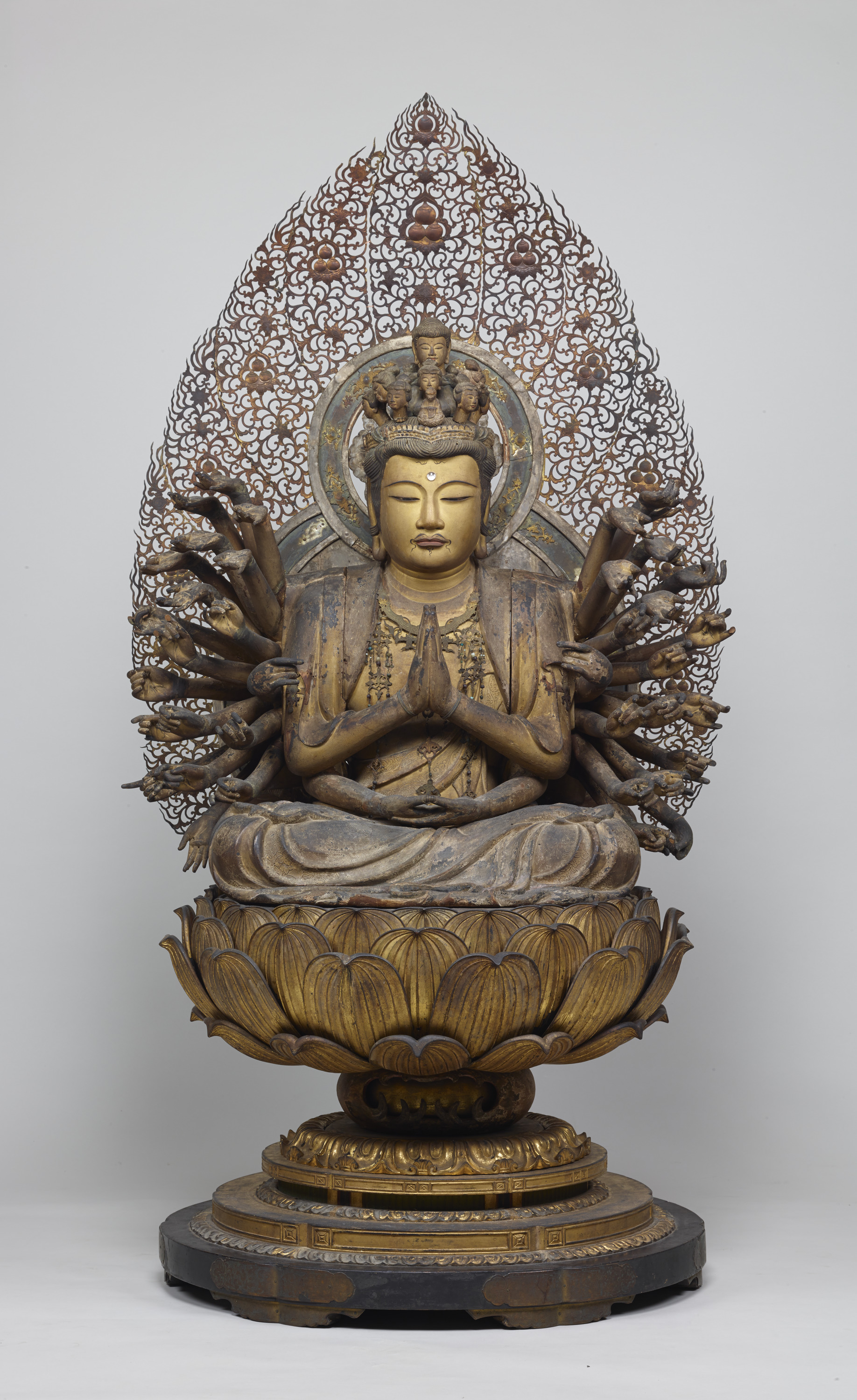
Senju Kannon, 14th century. Tokyo National Museum

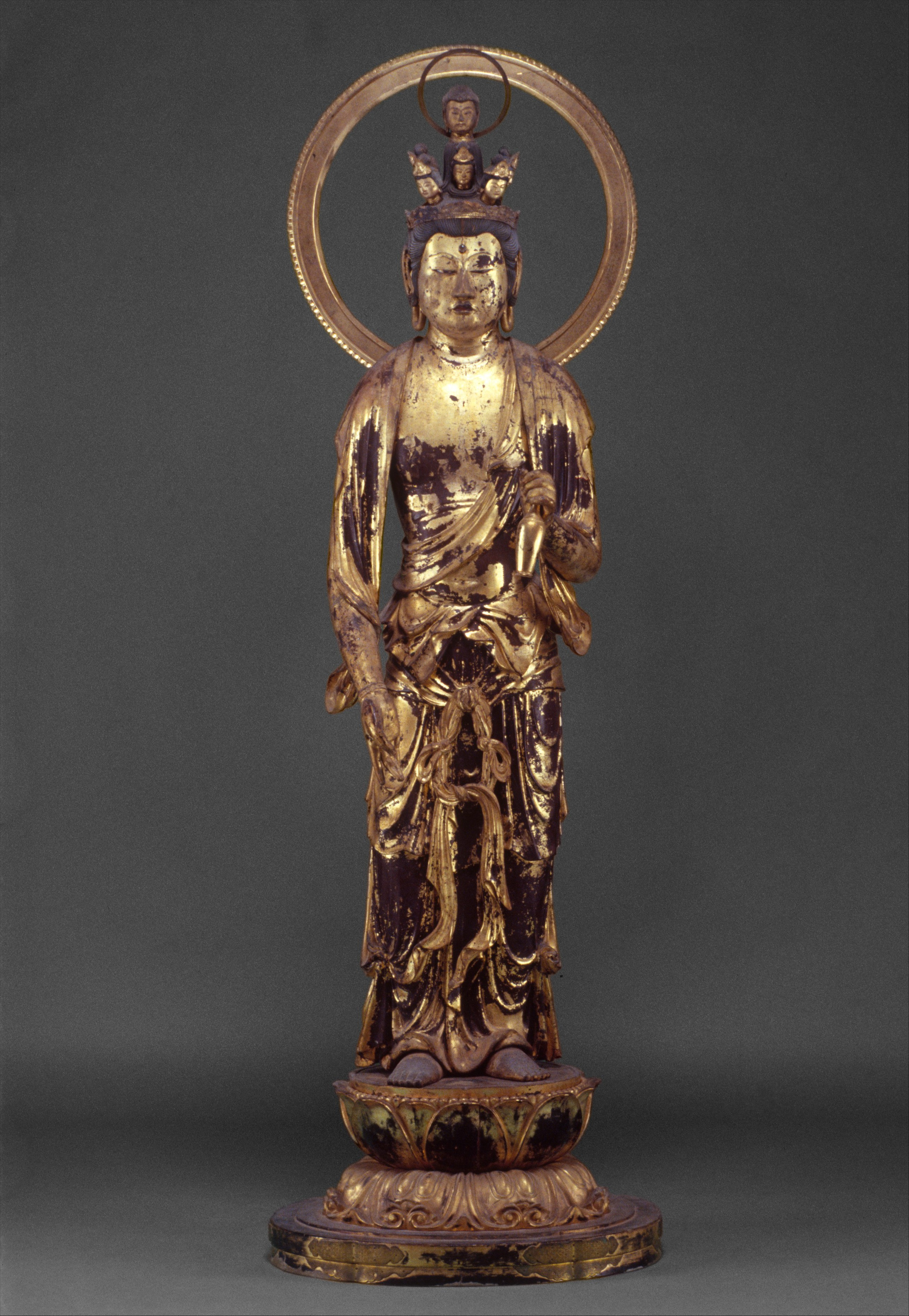
Jūichimen Kannon, 14th century. Metropolitan Museum of Art

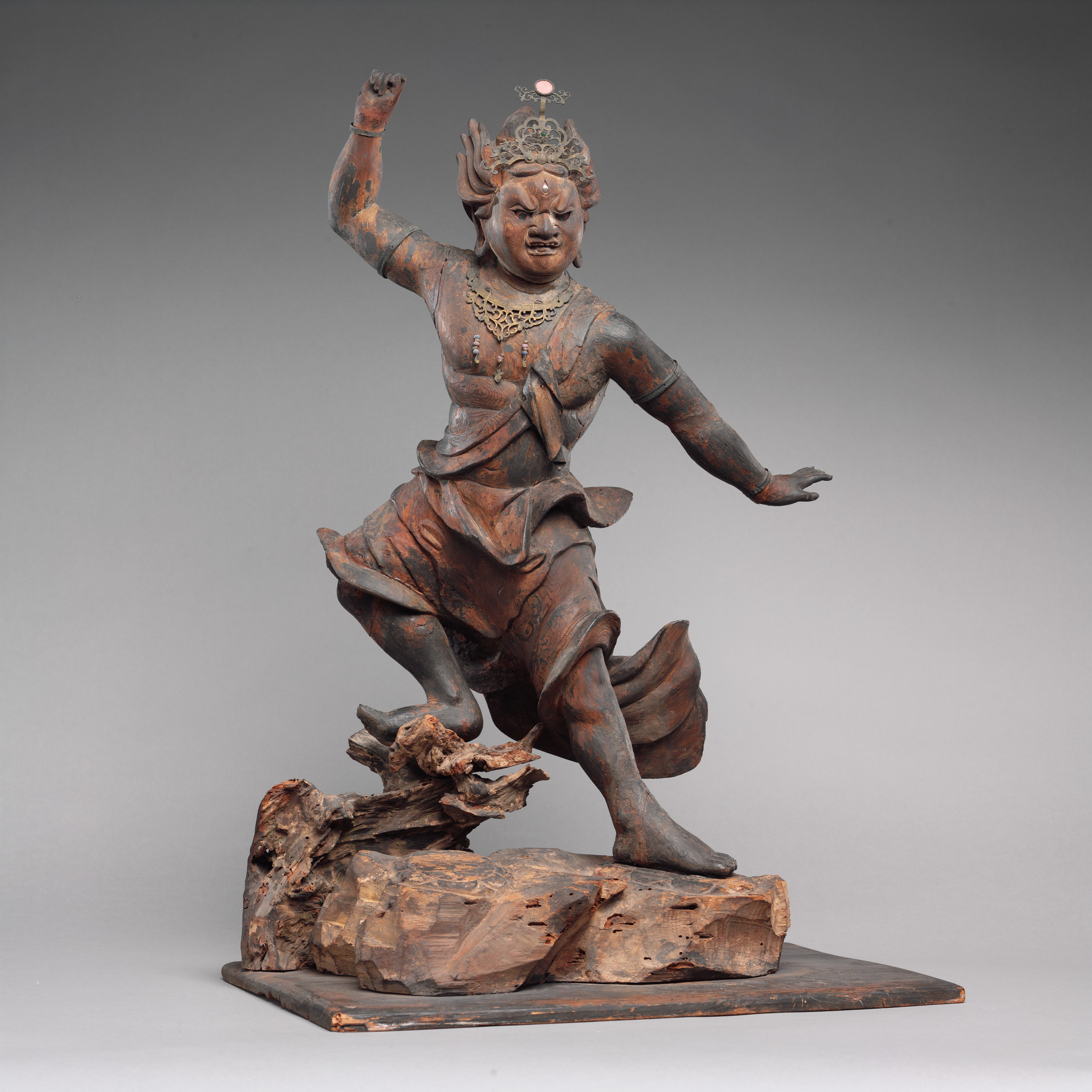
Zaō Gongen. 14th-16th century, Metropolitan Museum of Art

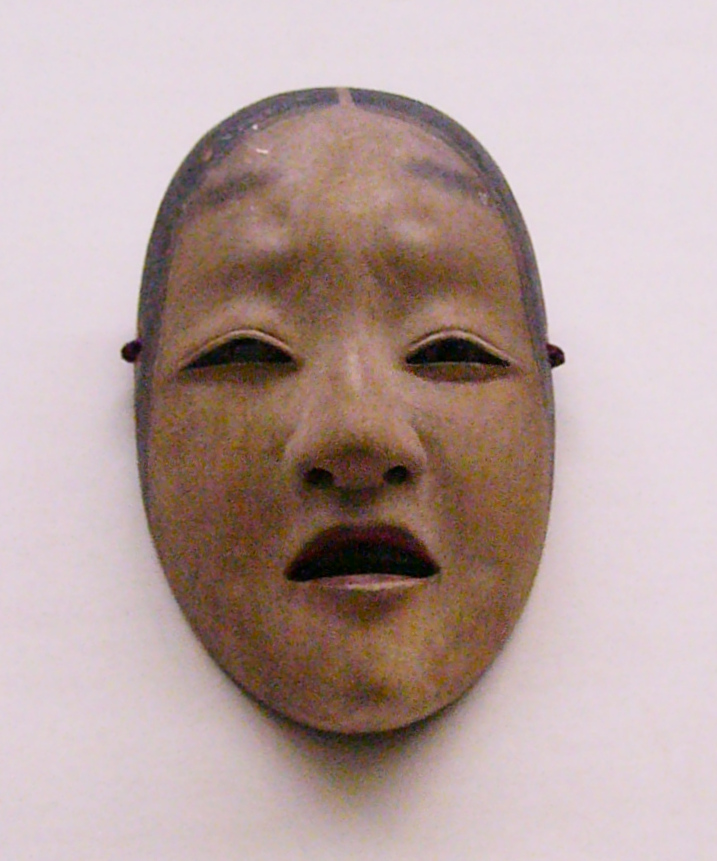
Noh mask, 16th century

=== Edo period ===
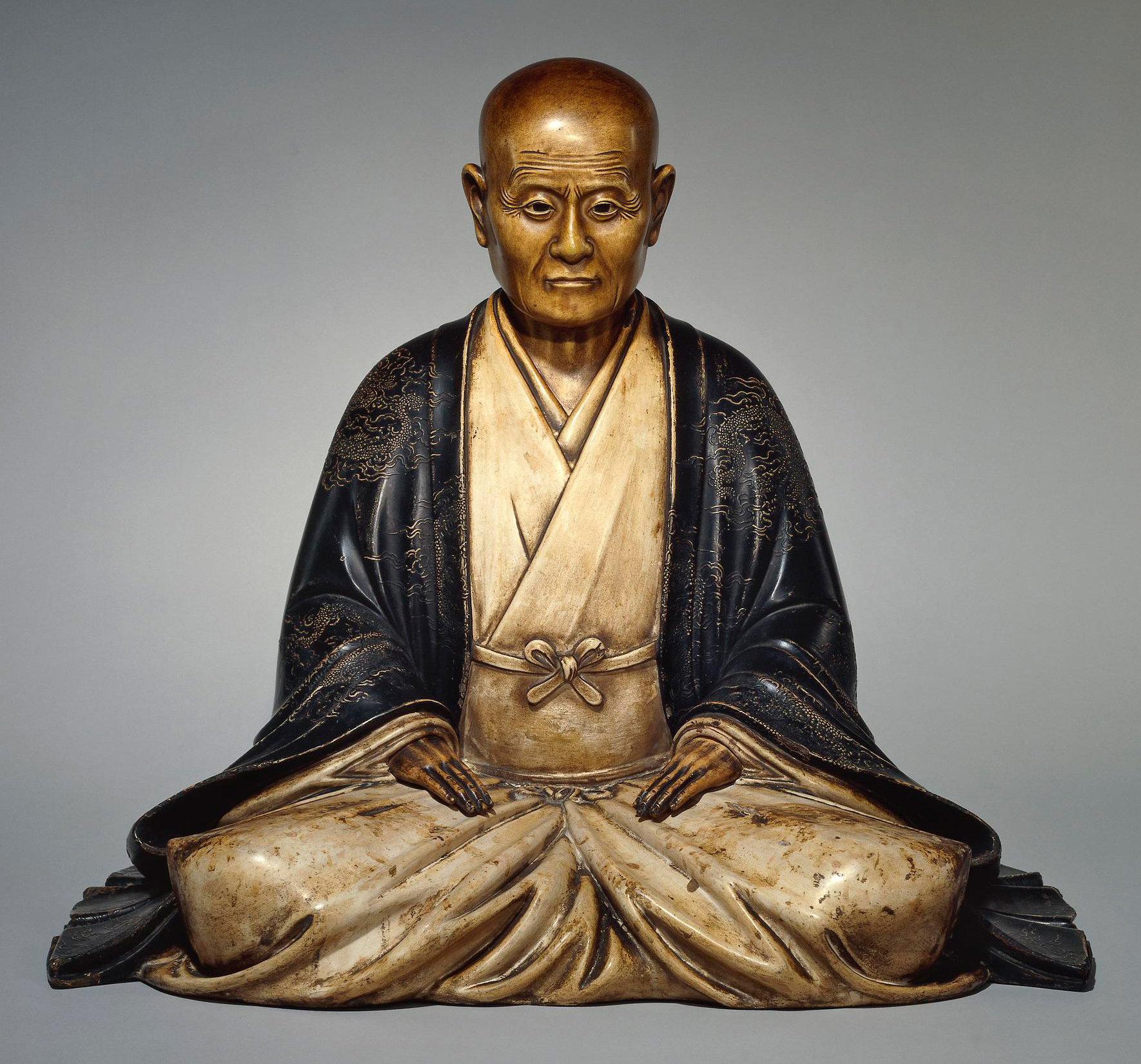
Sculpture of a retired chōnin as a lay Buddhist. Edo period, circa 1700.

The reconstruction of Buddhist temples burned in the civil wars required sculptors. The new sculptures were mostly conservatively carved from wood and gilt or polychromed. However, some Buddhist monk sculptors produced unpainted, roughly hewn images of wood. Enkū (1632–1695) and Mokujiki (1718–1810) are representative. They traveled through Japan and produced enormous works for missionary and ceremonial purposes. Their archaic and spiritual styles were reevaluated in the 20th century. The art of carving masks for Noh also continued to produce better works in the 17th century. In the Edo period, urbanization progressed in various parts of Japan and townspeople culture developed greatly. In this period, inro and netsuke became popular as accessories for men. Netsuke are elaborate carvings of wood and ivory, and mainly animals and imaginary creatures were the subject matter. Because netsuke are small and easy to collect, they remain popular with collectors. During this period, many sculptures were attached to the buildings of Shinto shrines built in the Gongen-zukuri style.

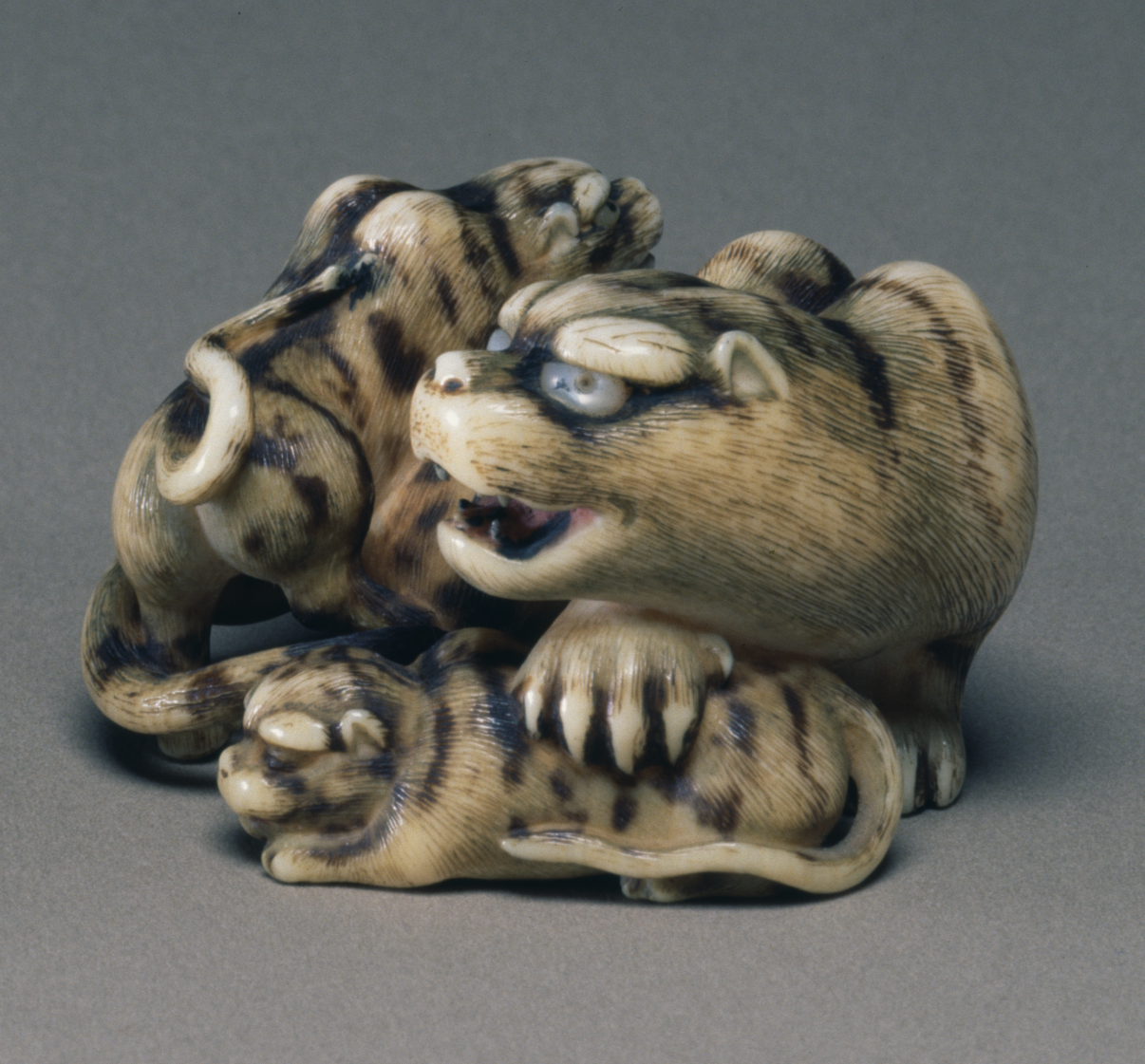
Netsuke of tigress with two cubs, mid-19th-century, ivory with shell inlay

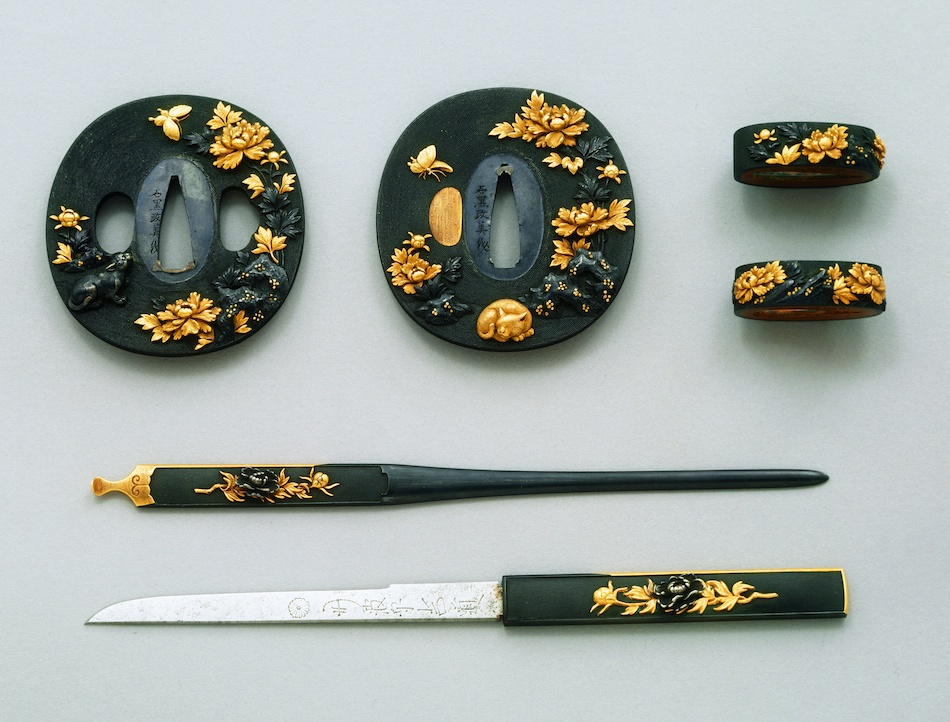
Sword fittings. Tsuba (top left) and fuchigashira (top right) made by Ishiguro Masayoshi in the 18th or 19th century. Kogai (middle) and kozuka (bottom) made by Yanagawa Naomasa in the 18th century.

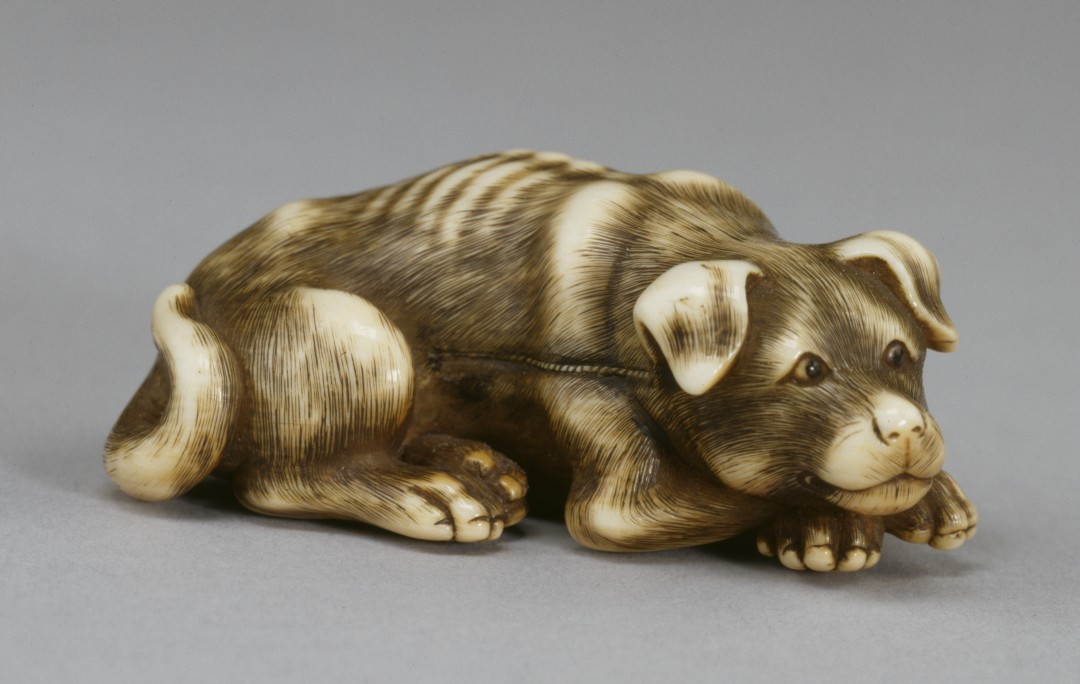
Izumiya Tomotada, netsuke in the form of a dog, late 18th century

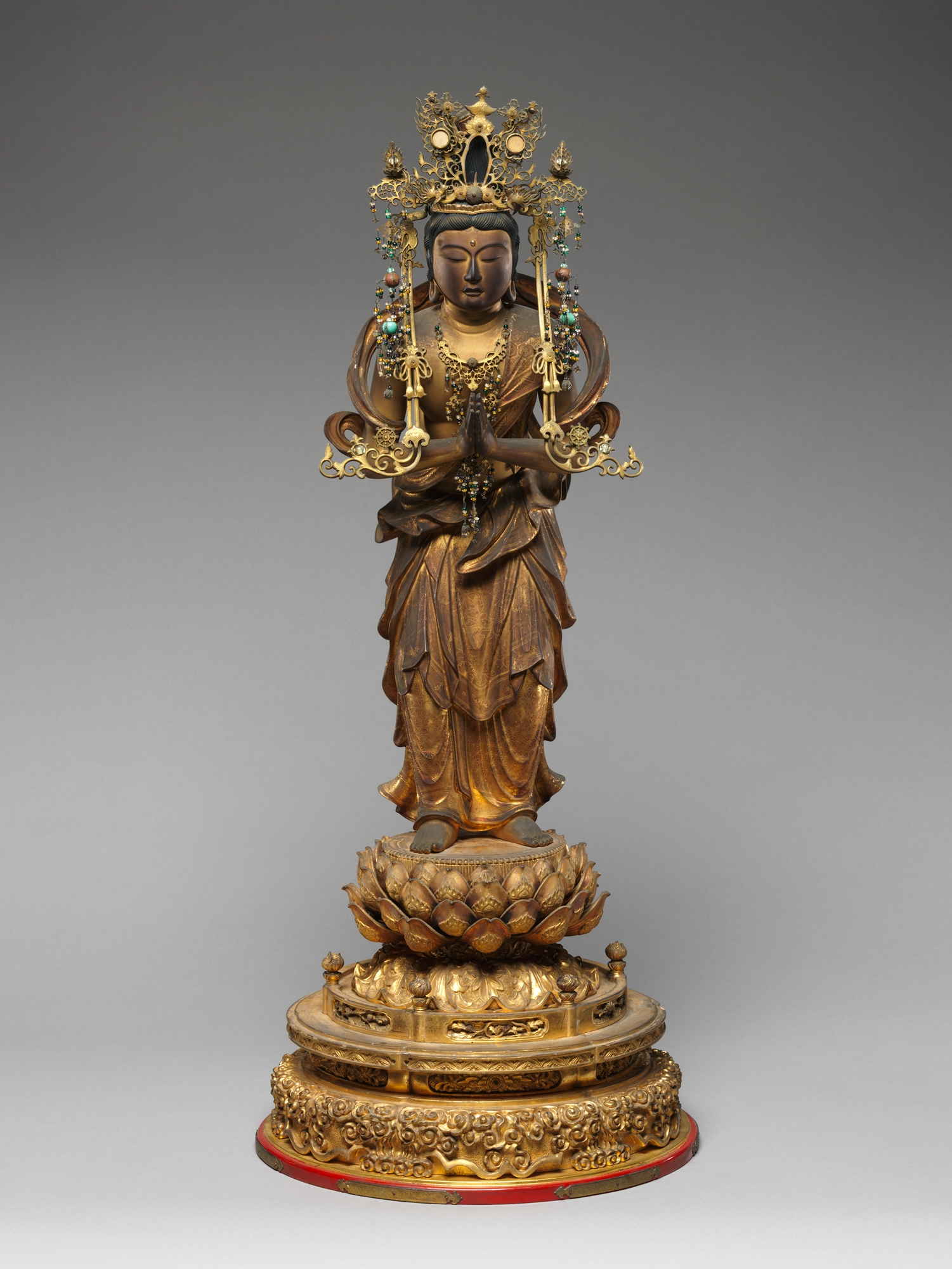
Seishi Bosatsu (Bodhisattva). 17th or 18th century. Metropolitan Museum of Art

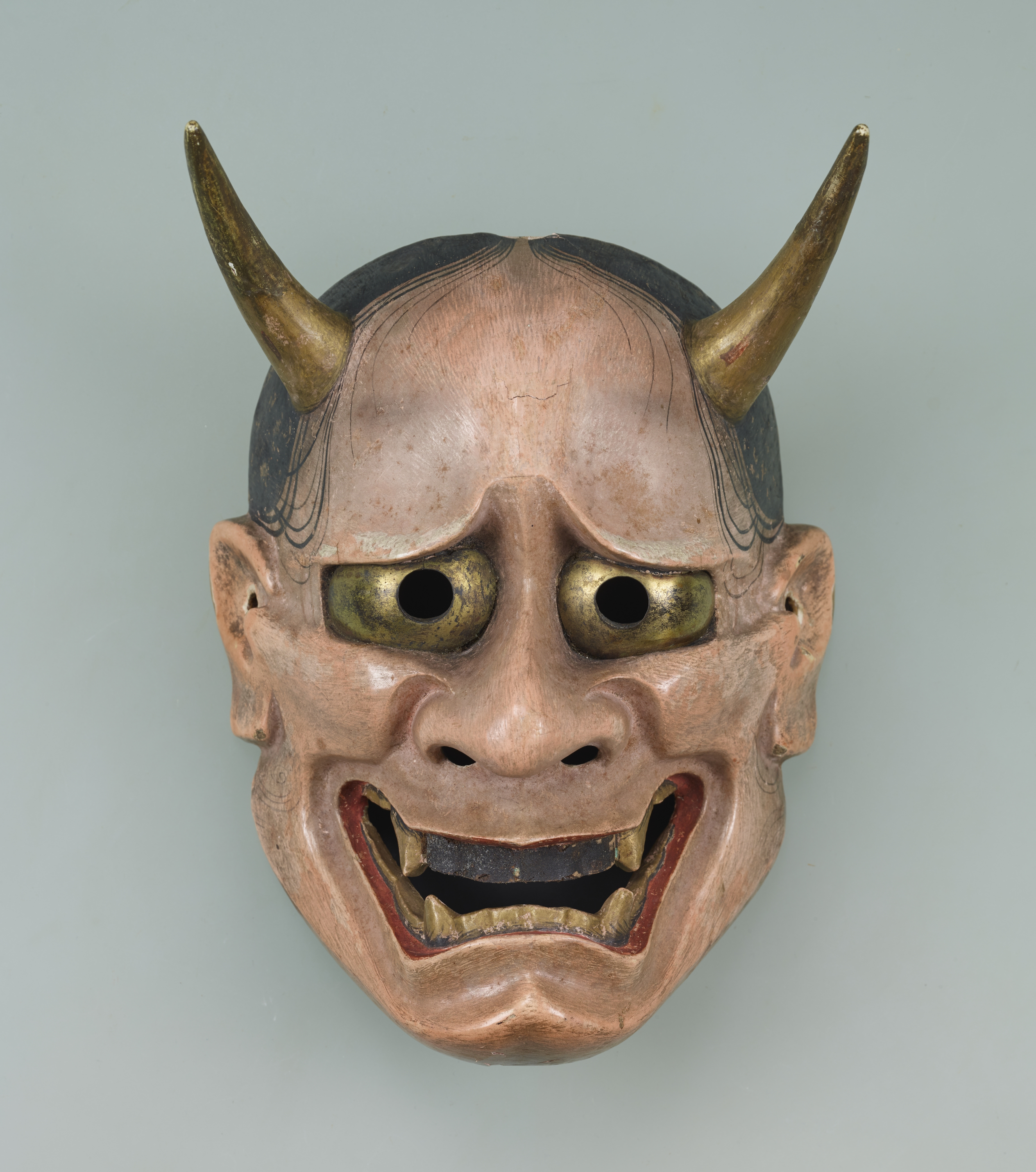
Noh Mask Hannya type. 17th or 18th century. Tokyo National Museum

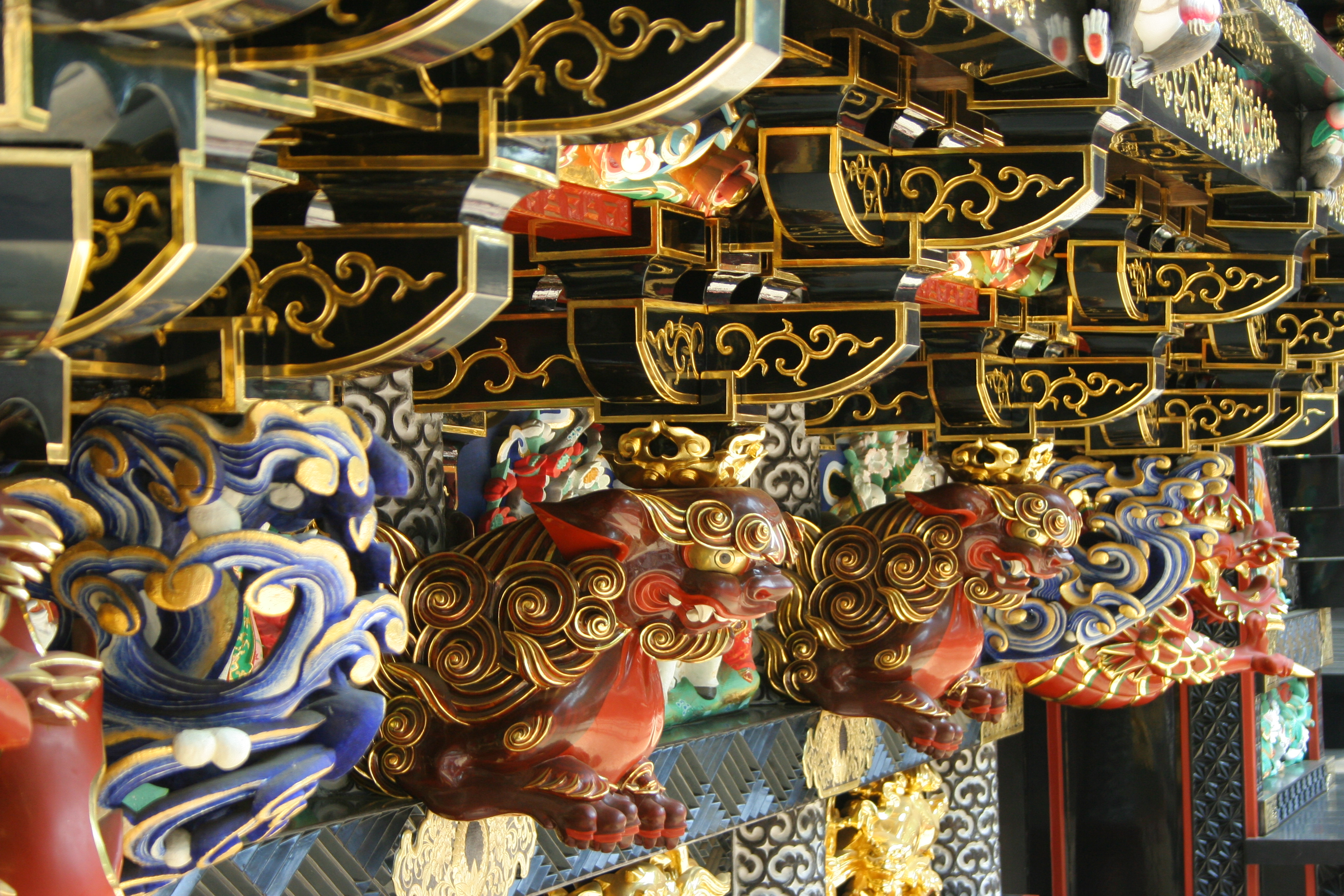
Kangiin Temple

=== Meiji to modern period ===
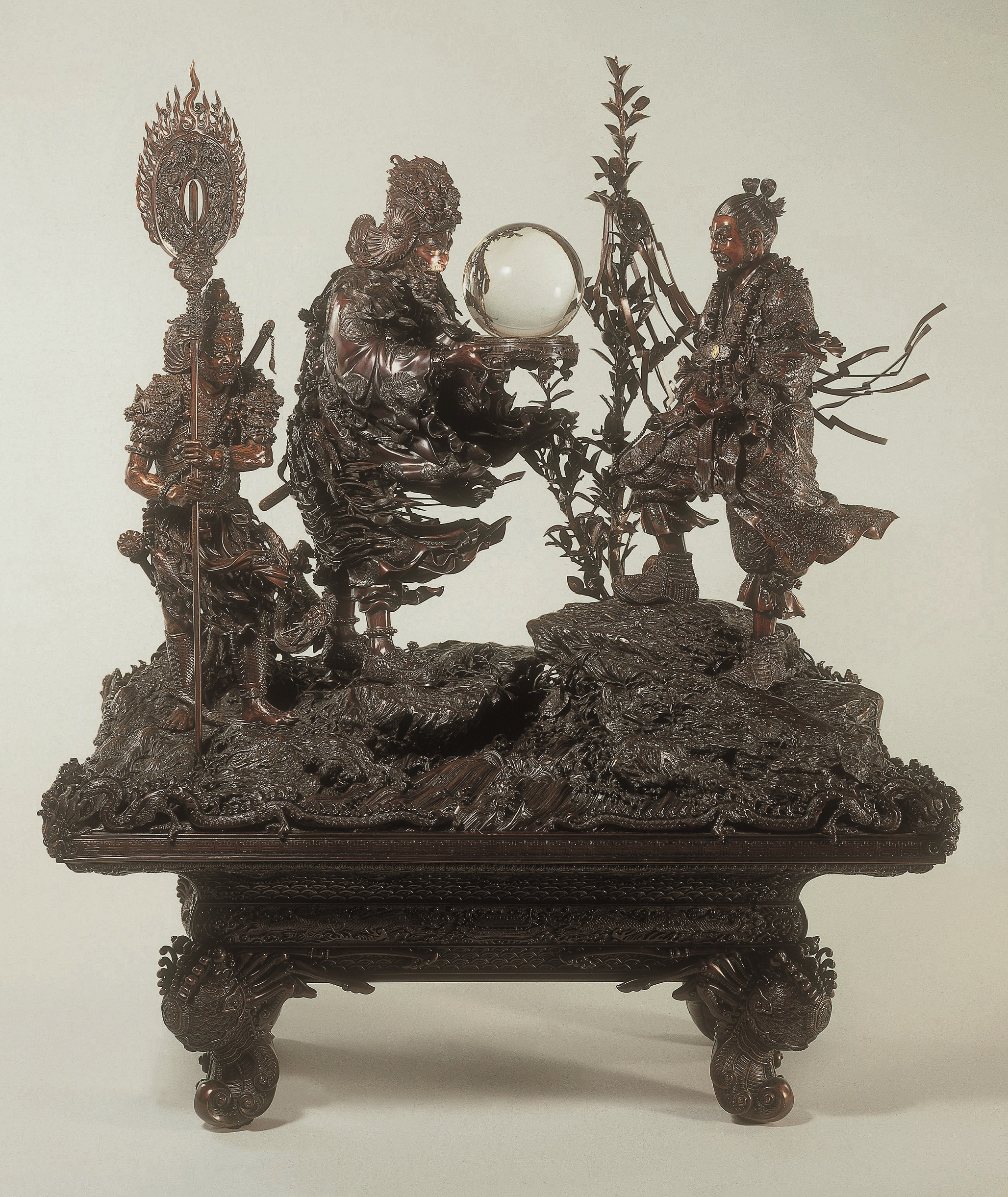
Haneakarutama, the dragon king, offering a tide jewel to Susano'o. 1881 or later, Khalili Collection of Japanese Art

In the late 19th century, the Tokugawa shogunate handed over control of Japan to the emperor, and Japan rapidly modernized and abolished the samurai class, and Japanese clothes began to be westernized. As a result, craftsmen who made Japanese swords, armor, netsuke, kiseru, inro and furnishings lost customers, but with the support of the new government, they began to make extremely elaborate metal, ivory and wood sculptures, which they then exported to the United States and Europe. During the Meiji and Taishō eras, Japanese sculpture progressed from the production of devotional objects, to decorative objects, and eventually to fine art. International exhibitions brought Japanese cast bronze to a new foreign audience, attracting strong praise. The past history of samurai weaponry equipped Japanese metalworkers to create metallic finishes in a wide range of colours. By combining and finishing copper, silver and gold in different proportions, they created specialised alloys including shakudō and shibuichi. With this variety of alloys and finishes, an artist could give the impression of full-colour decoration.

The stimulus of Western art forms returned sculpture to the Japanese art scene and introduced the plaster cast, outdoor heroic sculpture, and the school of Paris concept of sculpture as an "art form". Such ideas adopted in Japan during the late 19th century, together with the return of state patronage, rejuvenated sculpture.

In 1868, the new government banned the traditional syncretism of Shinto and Buddhism and ordered them to separate Buddhist temples and Shinto shrines in order to establish a centralized government by the Emperor, who was the supreme priest of Shinto. In response to this situation, some Shinto priests started to destroy Buddhist temples. Okakura Tenshin and others worked hard in political activities to protect Buddhist art, and the government declared that it would protect Buddhism. The destruction stopped around 1874, but many precious Buddhist statues were lost.

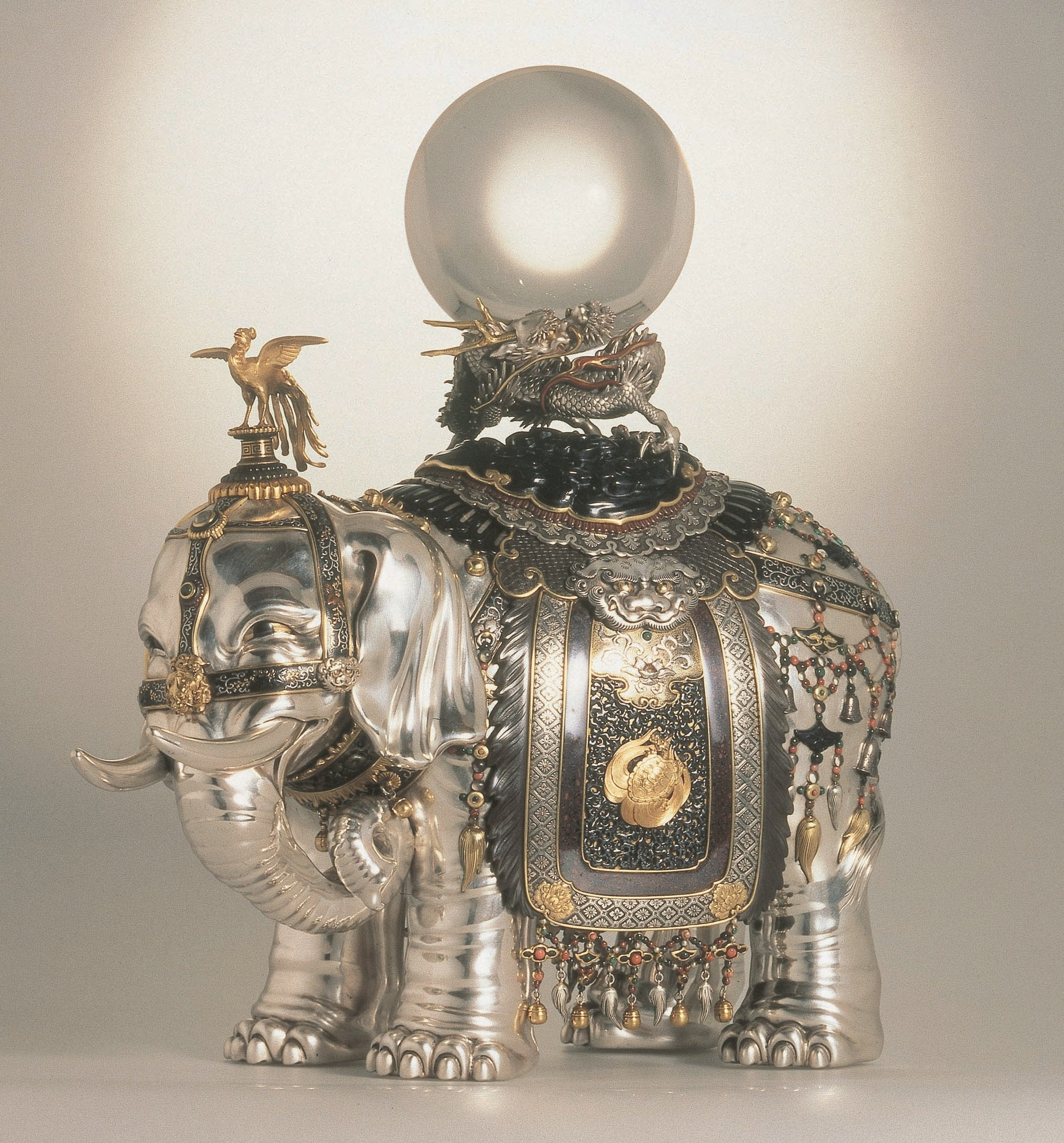
Incense burner (Koro), silver decorated with precious metals and rock crystal, 1890

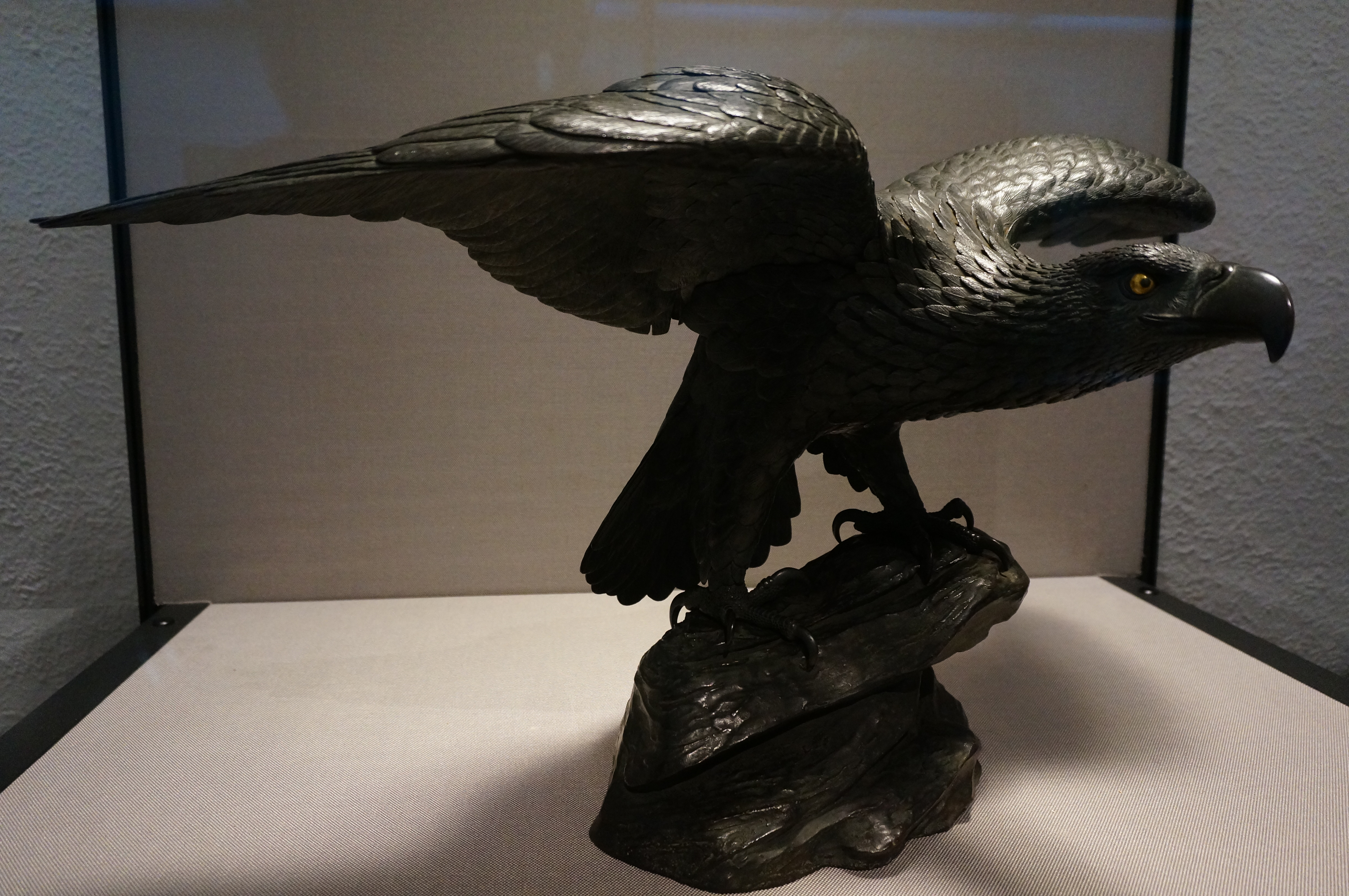
Eagle by Suzuki Chokichi, 1892, Tokyo National Museum

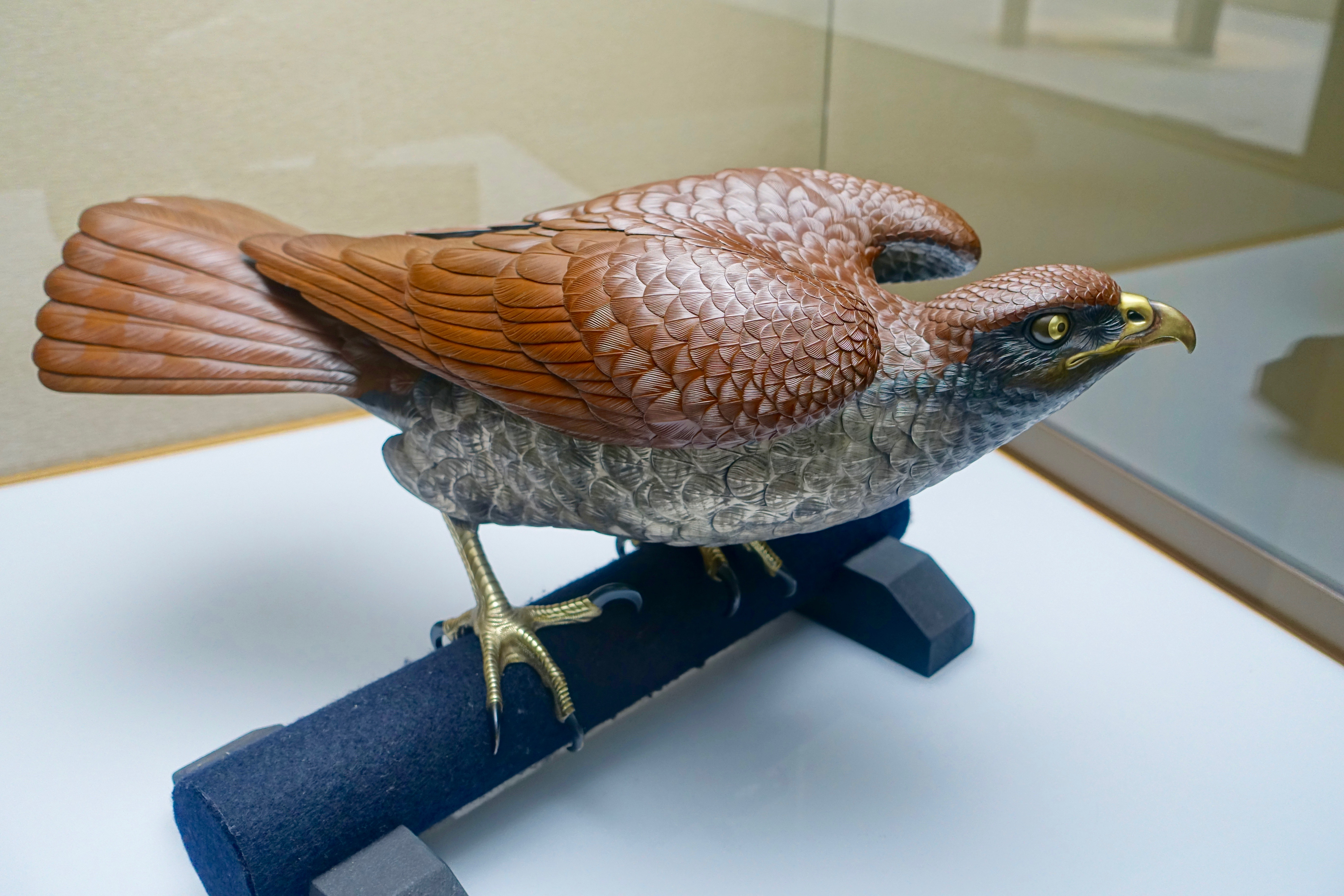
Twelve Hawks by Suzuki Chokichi, 1893

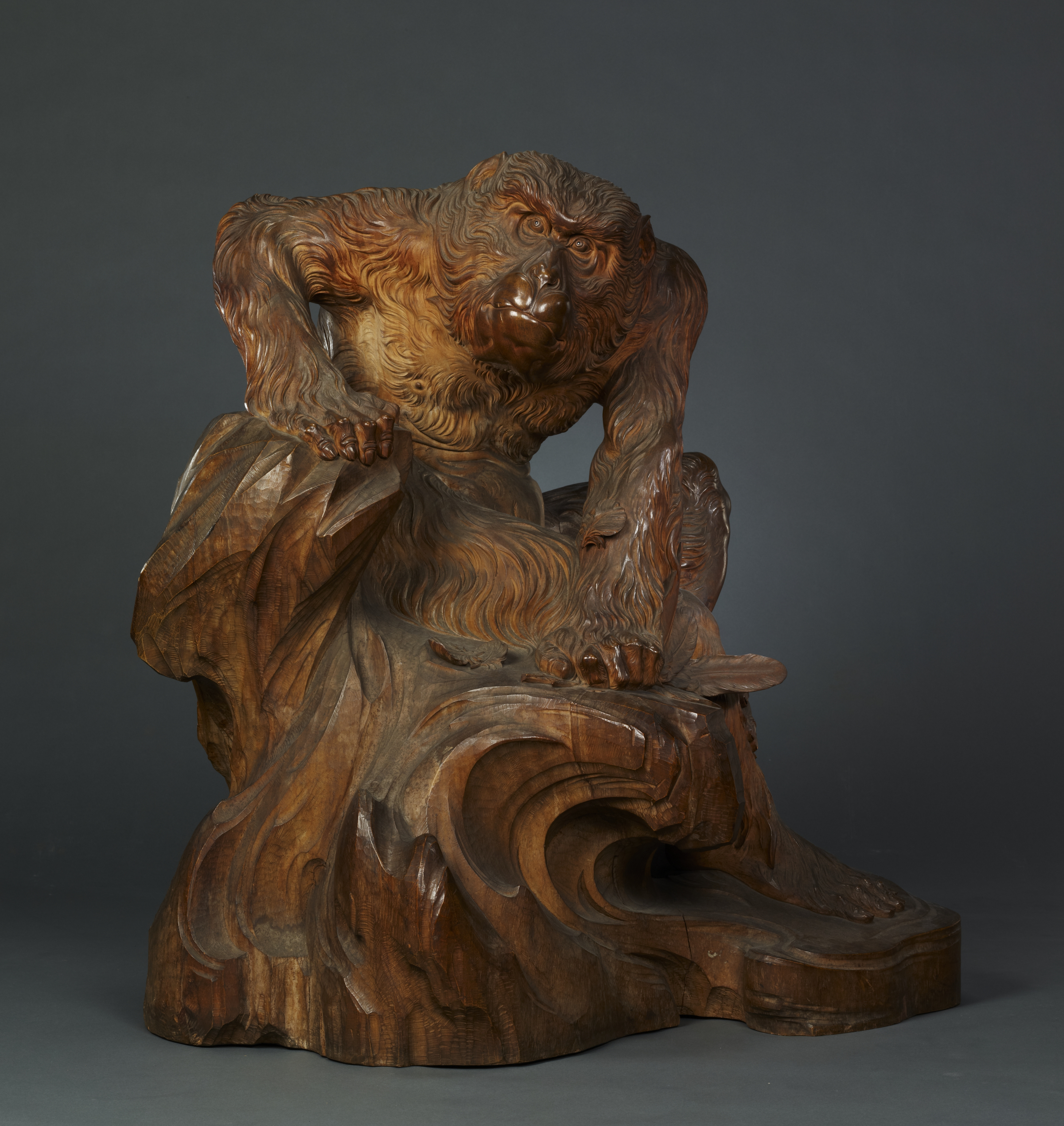
Old Monkey By Takamura Kōun, 1893

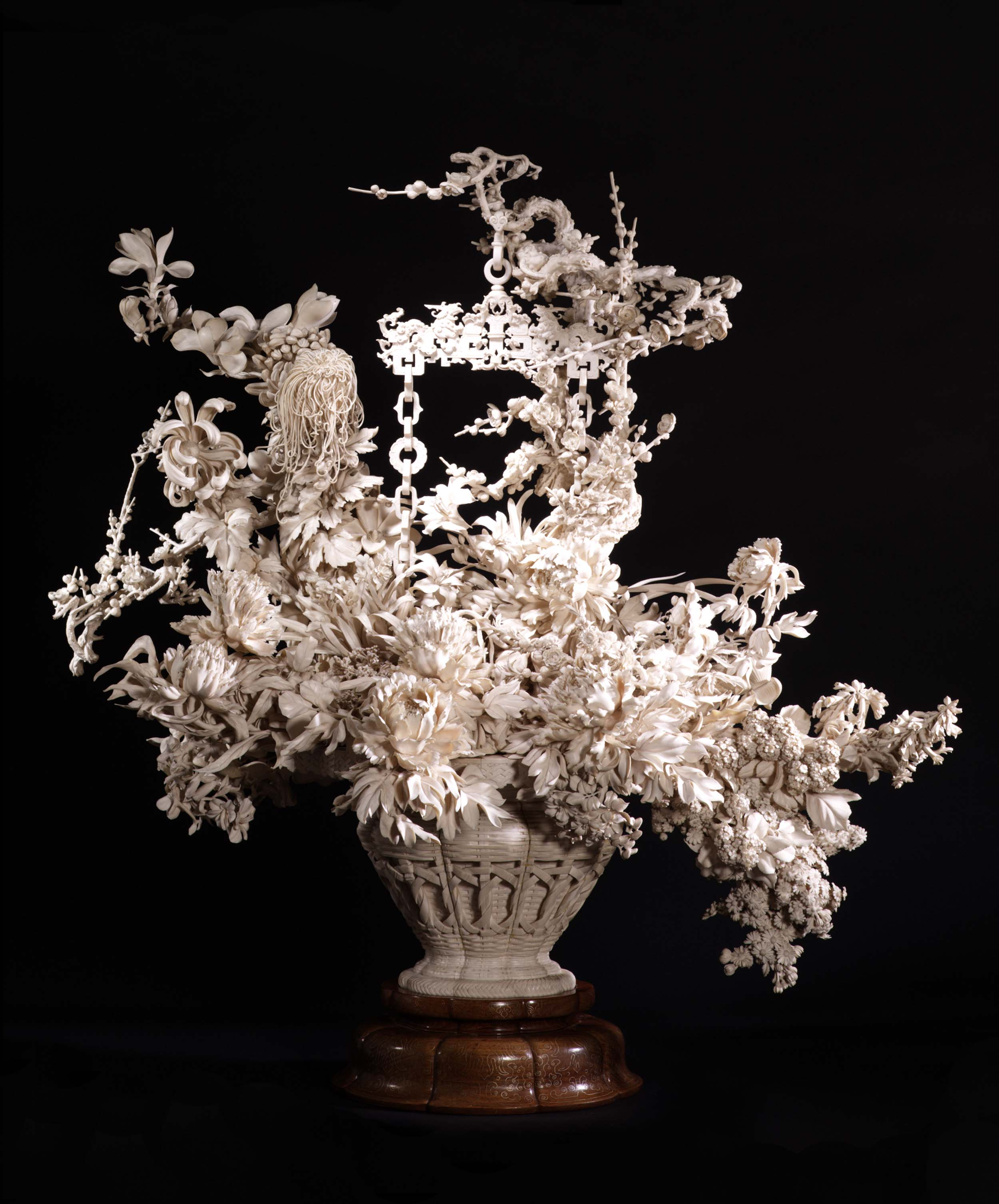
Basket of Flowers made of ivory, circa 1900 in the Khalili Collection of Japanese Art

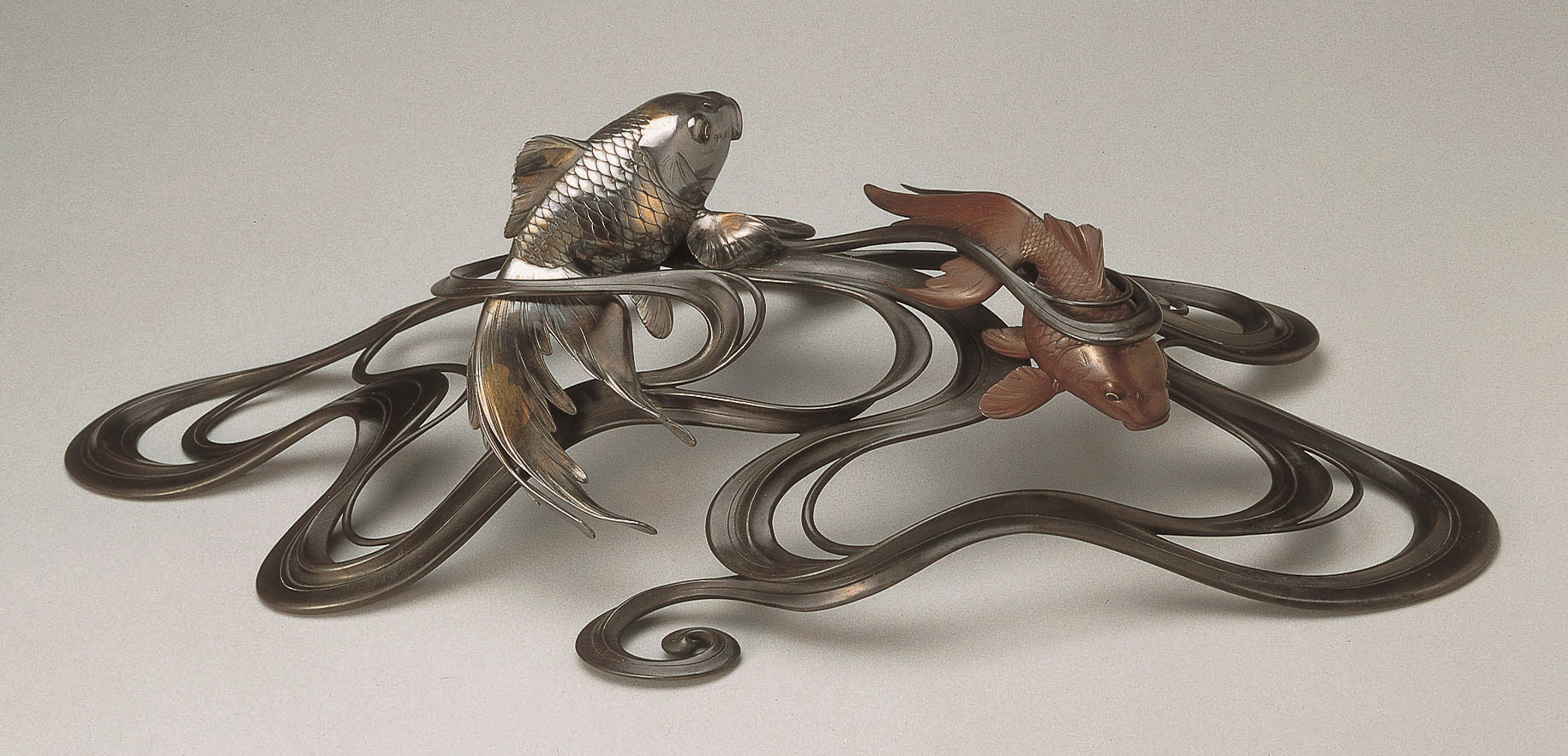
Okimono of fish in water, circa 1900 in the Khalili Collection of Japanese Art

== Contemporary art ==
After World War II, sculptors turned away from the figurative French school of Rodin and Maillol toward aggressive modern and avant-garde forms and materials, sometimes on an enormous scale. A profusion of materials and techniques characterized these new experimental sculptures, which also absorbed the ideas of international "op" (optical illusion) and pop art. A number of innovative artists were both sculptors and painters or printmakers, their new theories cutting across material boundaries.

In the 1970s, the ideas of contextual placement of natural objects of stone, wood, bamboo, and paper into relationships with people and their environment were embodied in the mono-ha school. The mono-ha artists emphasized materiality as the most important aspect of art and brought to an end the antiformalism that had dominated the avant-garde in the preceding two decades. This focus on the relationships between objects and people was ubiquitous throughout the arts world and led to a rising appreciation of "Japanese" qualities in the environment and a return to native artistic principles and forms. Among these precepts were a reverence for nature and various Buddhist concepts. Western ideology was carefully reexamined, and much was rejected as artists turned to their own environment—both inward and outward—for sustenance and inspiration. From the late 1970s through the late 1980s, artists began to create art which was both contemporary and Asian in sources and expression but still very much a part of the international scene. These artists focused on projecting their own individualism and national styles rather than on adapting or synthesizing Western ideas exclusively.

Outdoor sculpture, which came to the fore with the advent of the Hakone Open-Air Museum in 1969, was widely used in the 1980s. Cities supported enormous outdoor sculptures for parks and plazas, and major architects planned for sculpture in their buildings and urban layouts. Outdoor museums and exhibitions burgeoned, stressing the natural placement of sculpture in the environment. Because hard sculpture stone is not native to Japan, most outdoor pieces were created from stainless steel, plastic, or aluminum for "tension and compression" machine constructions of mirror-surfaced steel or for elegant, polished-aluminum, ultramodern shapes. The strong influence of modern high technology on the artists resulted in experimentation with kinetic, tensile forms, such as flexible arcs and "info-environmental" sculptures using lights. Video components and video art developed rapidly from the late 1970s throughout the 1980s. The new Japanese experimental sculptors could be understood as working with Buddhist ideas of permeability and regeneration in structuring their forms, in contrast to the general Western conception of sculpture as something with finite and permanent contours.

In the 1980s, wood and natural materials were used prominently by many sculptors, who now began to place their works in inner courtyards and enclosed spaces. Also, a Japanese feeling for rhythmic motion, captured in recurring forms as a "systematic gestural motion", was used by both long-established artists like Kyubei Kiyomizu and Hidetoshi Nagasawa and the younger generation led by Shigeo Toya.

== See also ==
- Culture of Japan
  - Japanese art
- List of National Treasures of Japan (sculptures)
  - Shinjō Itō
- List of collections of Japanese art
