= Kōfuku-ji =

Buddhist temple in Nara, Japan

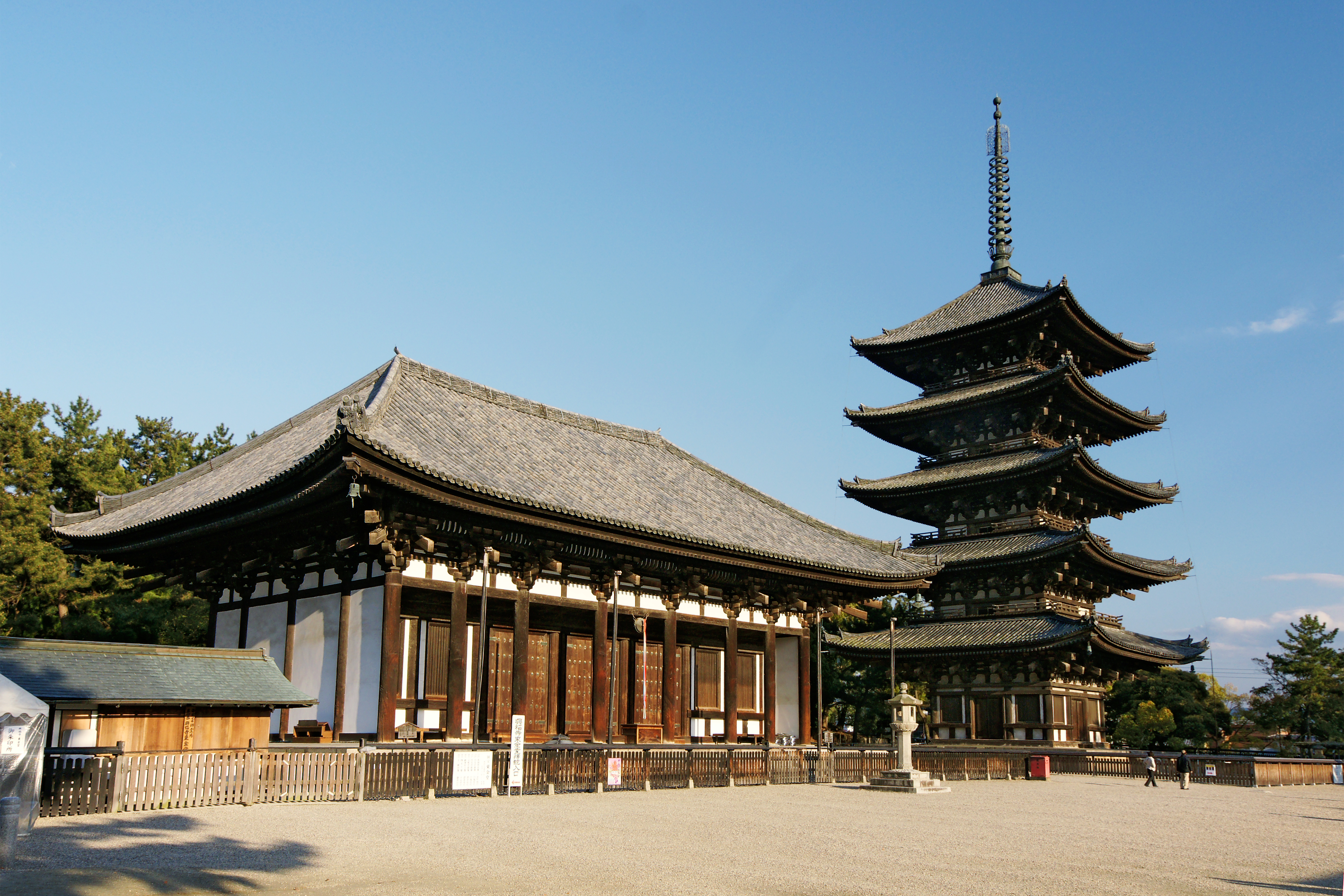
- Five-story pagoda and Tōkondō at Kōfuku-ji

Religion
- Affiliation: Hossō
- Deity: the Buddha

Location
- Location: 48 Noboriōji-chō, Nara, Nara Prefecture
- Country: Japan
- Interactive map of Kōfuku-ji
- Coordinates: 34°41′00″N 135°49′52″E

Architecture
- Founder: Emperor Tenji
- Completed: 669

Website
- www.kohfukuji.com

Kōfuku-ji (興福寺; Japanese pronunciation: [koꜜː.ɸɯ̥.kɯ.dʑi]) is a Buddhist temple in Japan that was once one of the powerful Nanto Shichi Daiji 'Seven Great Temples' in the city of Nara. The temple is the national headquarters of the East Asian Yogācāra school. It is part of the Historic Monuments of Ancient Nara, a World Heritage Site.

== History ==
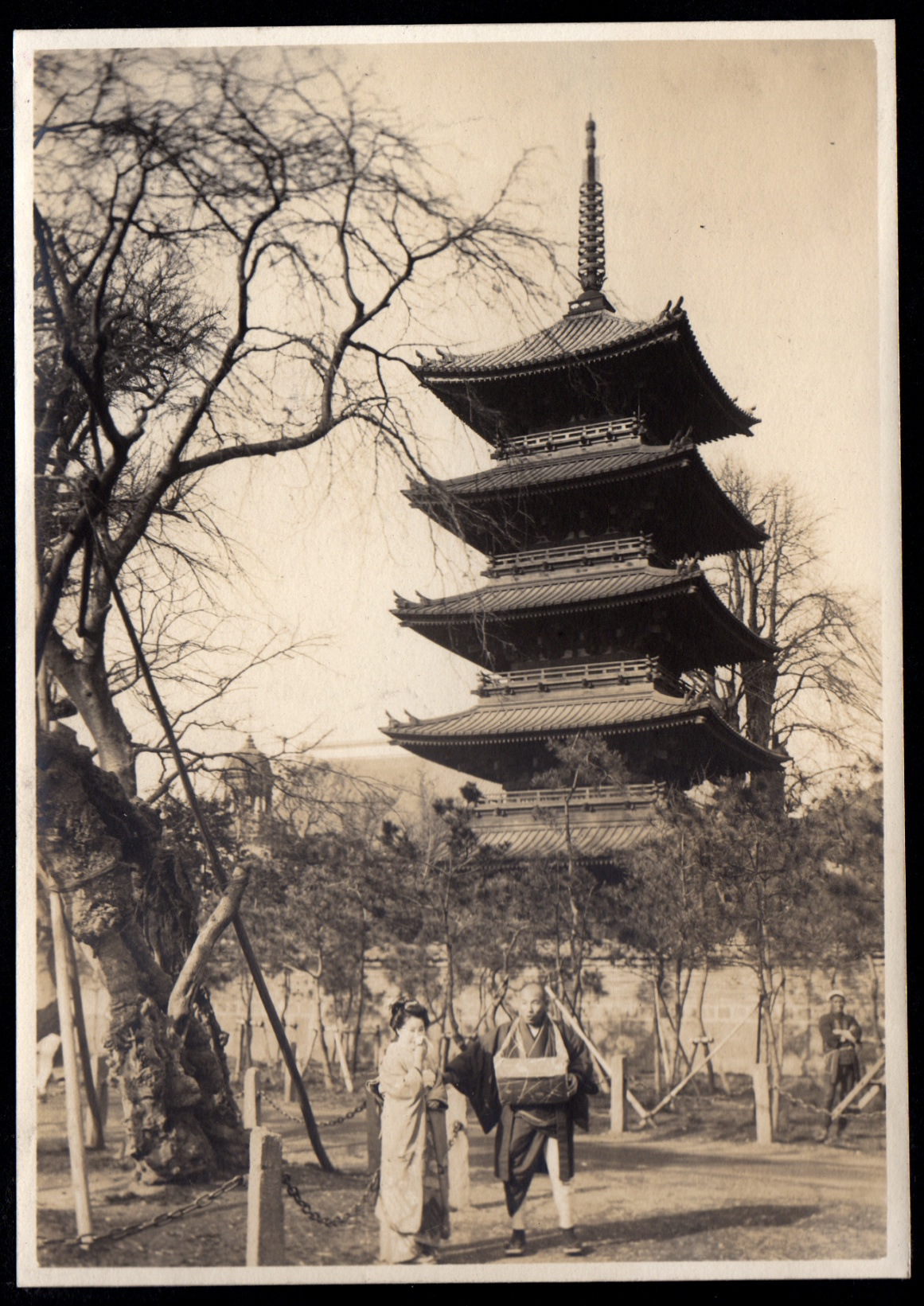
Kofuku-ji in 1911

Kōfuku-ji has its origin as a temple that was established in 669 by Kagami-no-Ōkimi (鏡大君), the wife of Fujiwara no Kamatari, wishing for her husband's recovery from illness. Its original site was in Yamashina, Yamashiro Province (present-day Kyoto). In 672, the temple was moved to Fujiwara-kyō, the first planned Japanese capital to copy the orthogonal grid pattern of Chang'an. In 710, the temple was dismantled for the second time and moved to its present location, on the east side of the newly constructed capital, Heijō-kyō, today's Nara. Kōfuku-ji (the Temple that Generates Blessings) got its name from Kamatari's son Fujiwara no Fuhito, who named it after the Vimalakirti Sutra.

Kōfuku-ji was the Fujiwara's tutelary temple, and enjoyed prosperity for as long as the family did. The temple was not only an important center for the Buddhist religion, but also retained influence over the imperial government, even by "aggressive means" in some cases, thanks to the marriage of Fuhito's daughter to Emperor Shōmu, becoming the Empress Kōmyō. In 730, as a result of her conversion and devotion to Buddhism, she ordered the construction of the Five-storied pagoda (五重塔, Gojū-no-tō), now a National Treasure. In 734, her commission of the Saikondō was completed in memory of her mother's death. Under her supervision, according to the Fusō Ryakuki, Japan's first medical dispensary and welfare institution was established at the temple (at the cost of 50 vassal households, 100 hectares of rice from Iyo Province, and 130,000 sheaves worth from Echizen).

When many of the Nanto Shichi Daiji, such as Tōdai-ji, declined after the move of capital to Heian-kyō (Kyoto), Kōfuku-ji kept its significance because of its connection to the Fujiwara.

The temple was damaged and destroyed by civil wars and fires many times, and was rebuilt as many times as well, although finally some of the important buildings, such as one of the three golden halls, the Nandaimon, Chūmon and the corridor were never reconstructed and are missing today. The rebuilding of the Central Golden Hall was completed in 2018.

Rokusō-an (六窓庵, Six Window Hut) was a chashitsu formerly located at the temple and considered one of the San-meiseki (三名席, Three Famous Tearooms). It was relocated due its deteriorated state and is now in the gardens of the Tokyo National Museum.

== Architecture and treasures ==
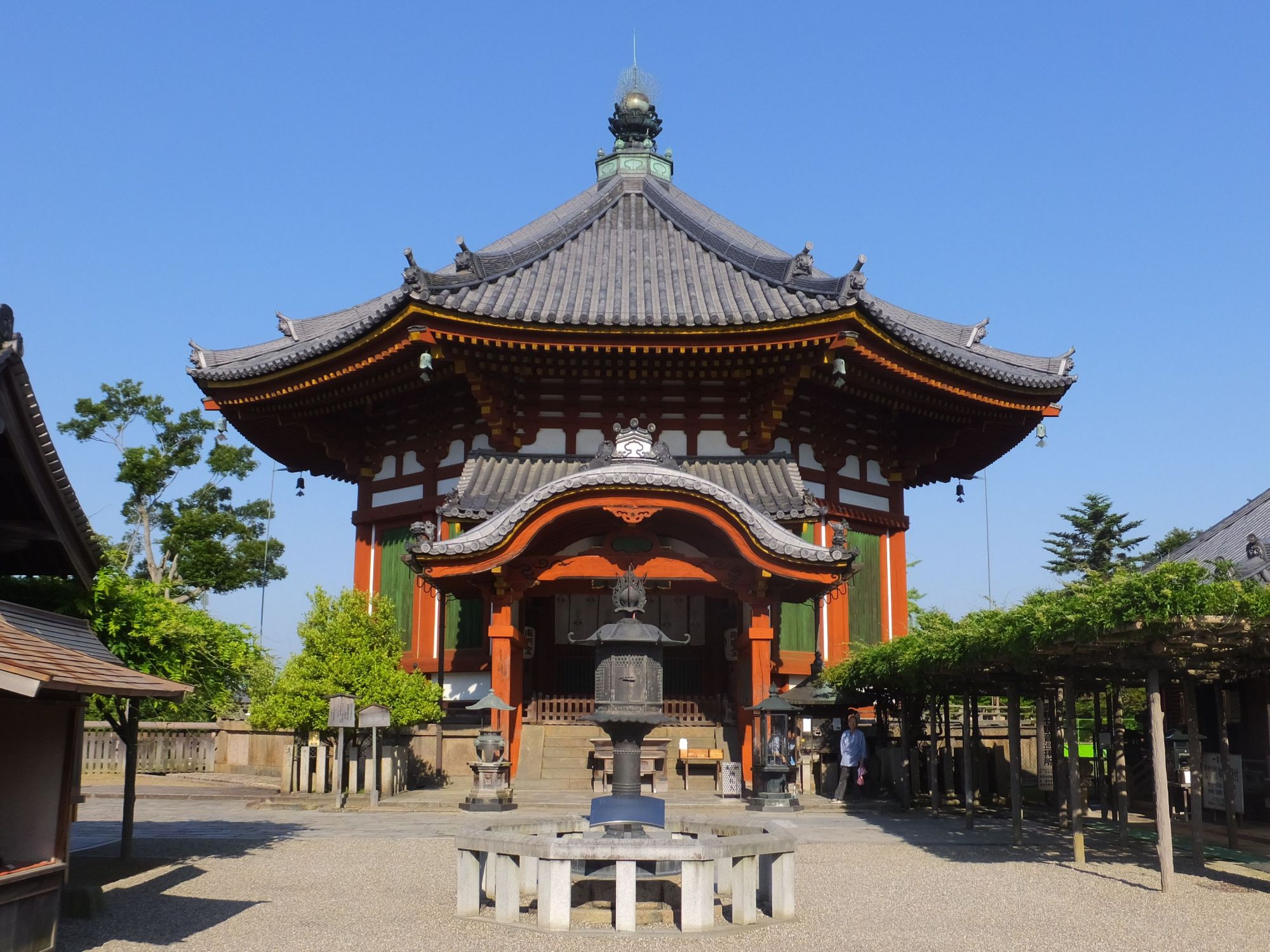
Nan'endō is the No.9 of Saigoku 33 Pilgrimage

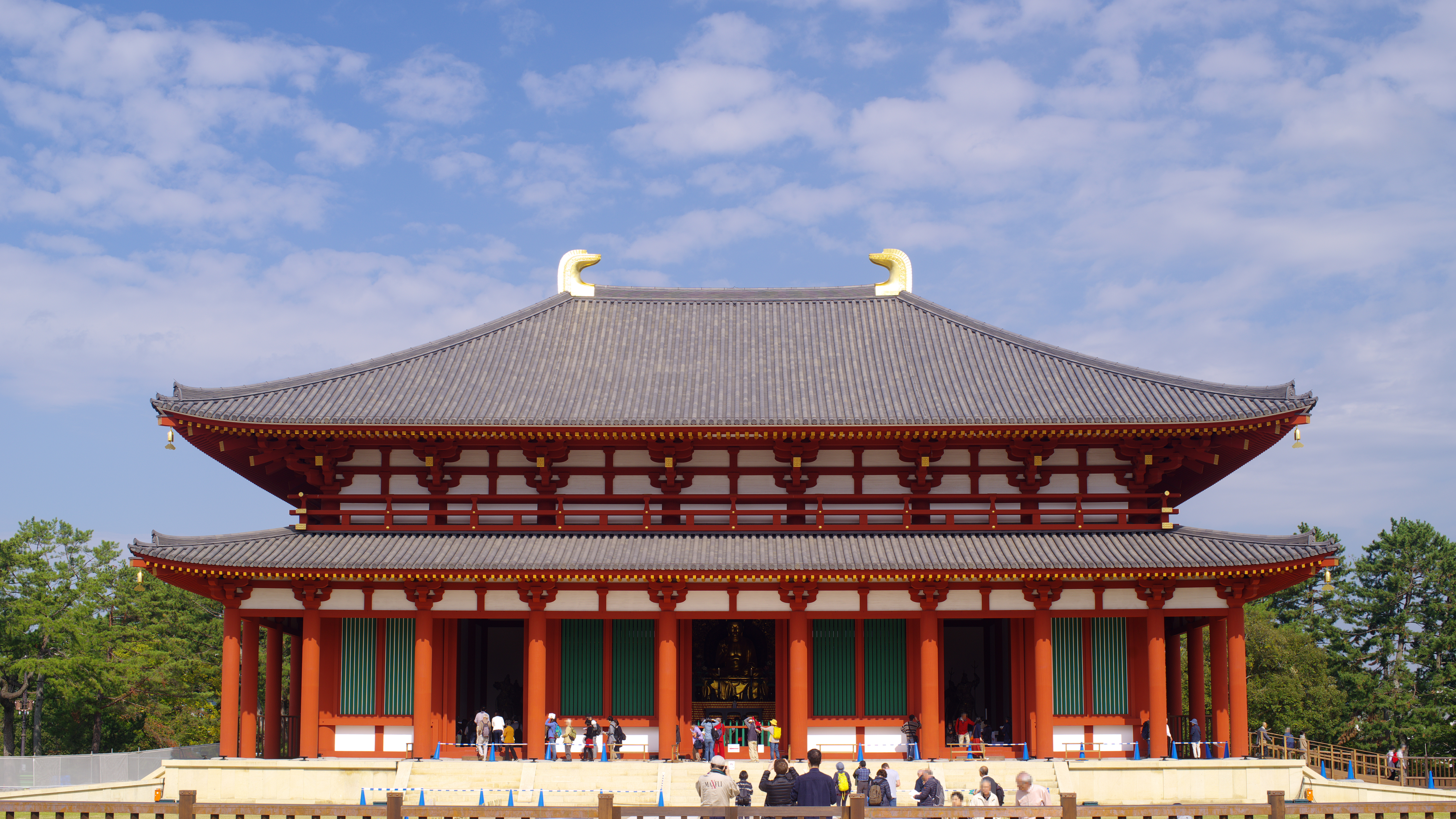
Chū-kondō (Central Golden Hall)

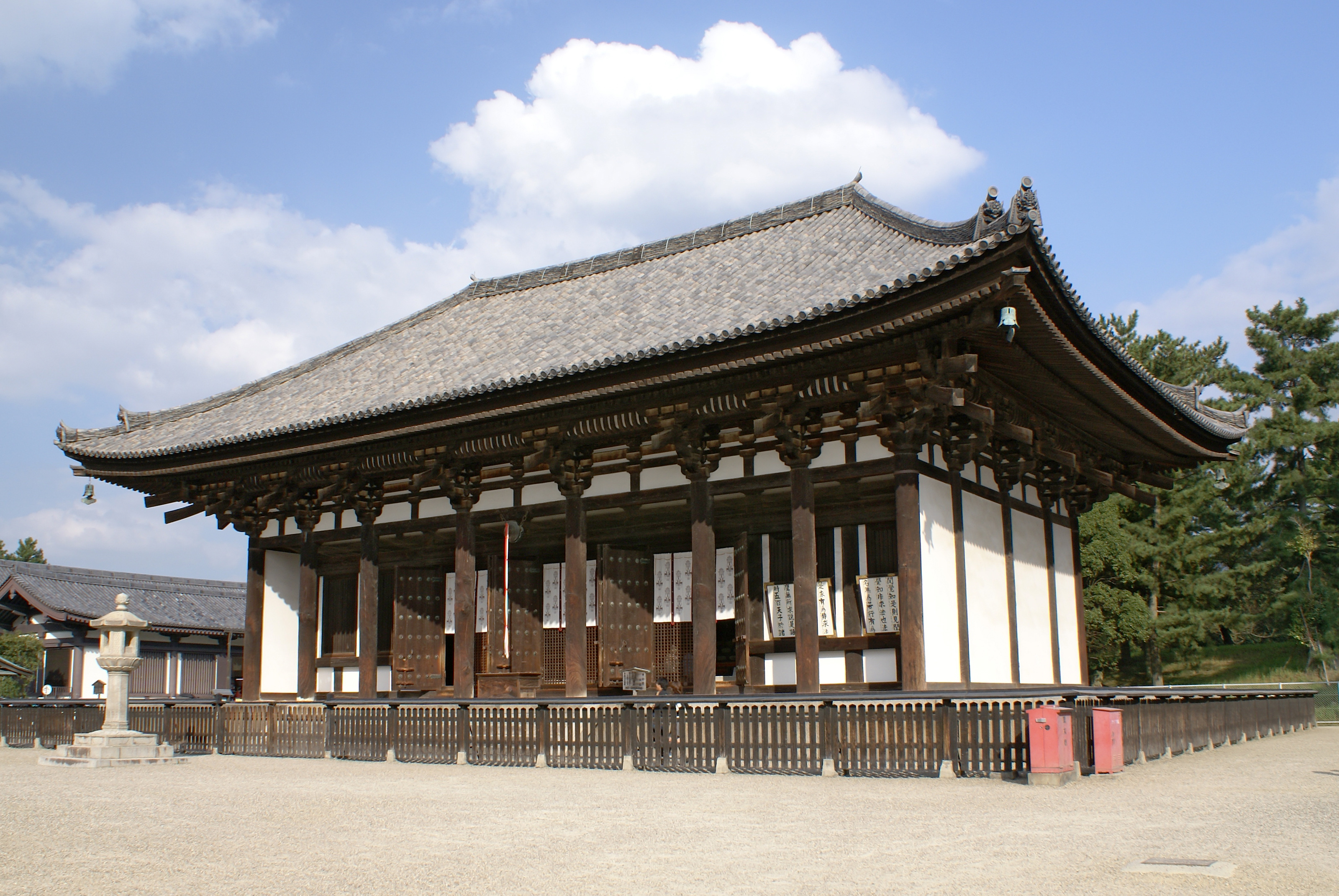
Tō-kondō (East Golden Hall)

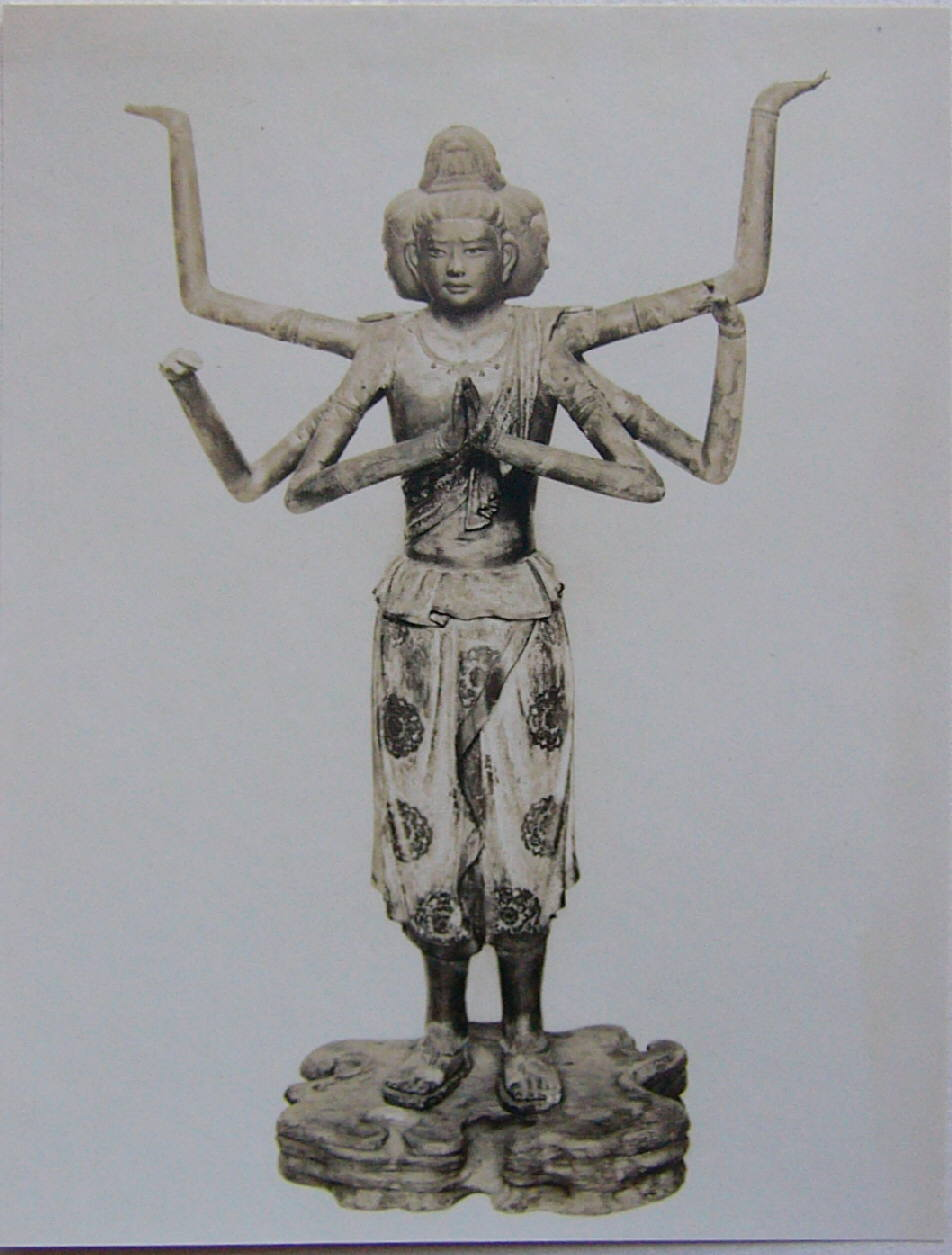
Asura (Buddhism)

The following are some of the temple's buildings and treasures of note.

=== Architecture ===
- East Golden Hall (東金堂, Tō-kondō), 1425, one of the former three golden halls (National Treasure)
- Central Golden Hall (中金堂, Chū-kondō), 2018, reconstructed, the former temporary Central Golden Hall building (仮金堂) now serves as the temporary Lecture Hall (仮講堂)
- Five-storied pagoda (五重塔, Gojū-no-tō), 1426 (National Treasure)
- Three-storied pagoda (三重塔, Sanjū-no-tō), 1185 (National Treasure)
- North Octagonal Hall (北円堂, Hoku'endō), 1210 (National Treasure)
- South Octagonal Hall (南円堂, Nan'endō), 1741, Site No.9 of Saigoku 33 Pilgrimage (Important Cultural Property)
- Bath House (大湯屋, Ōyūya), 1394–1427 (Important Cultural Property)

=== Treasures ===
- (Statue) The Devas of the Eight Classes, including dry-lacquer Asura (National Treasure)
- (Statue) Ten principal disciples (National Treasure)
- (Statue) Thousand-armed Kannon (National Treasure)
- (Statue) Amoghapāśa (不空羂索観音, Fukūkensaku Kannon) attributed to Kōkei, is housed in Nan'endō (National Treasure)

== Plan ==
Showing the original layout of the temple, with the later three-storied pagoda, Nan'en-dō, and Ōyūya superimposed. Of the buildings marked, only these three together with the five-storied pagoda, Tōkon-dō and Hoku'en-dō remain.

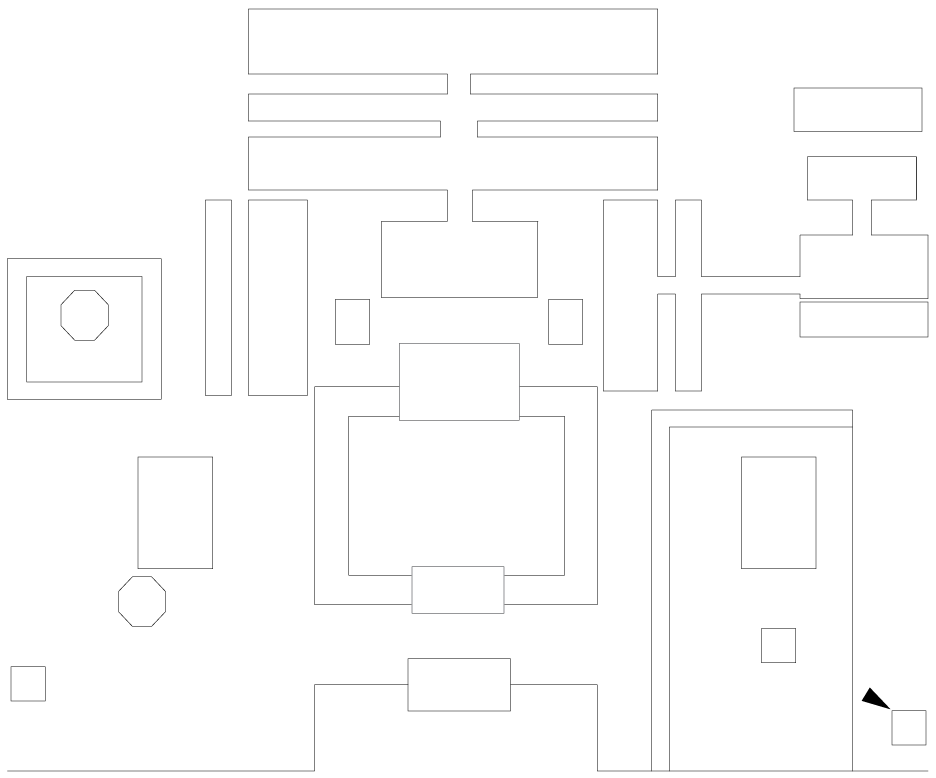

== Gallery ==
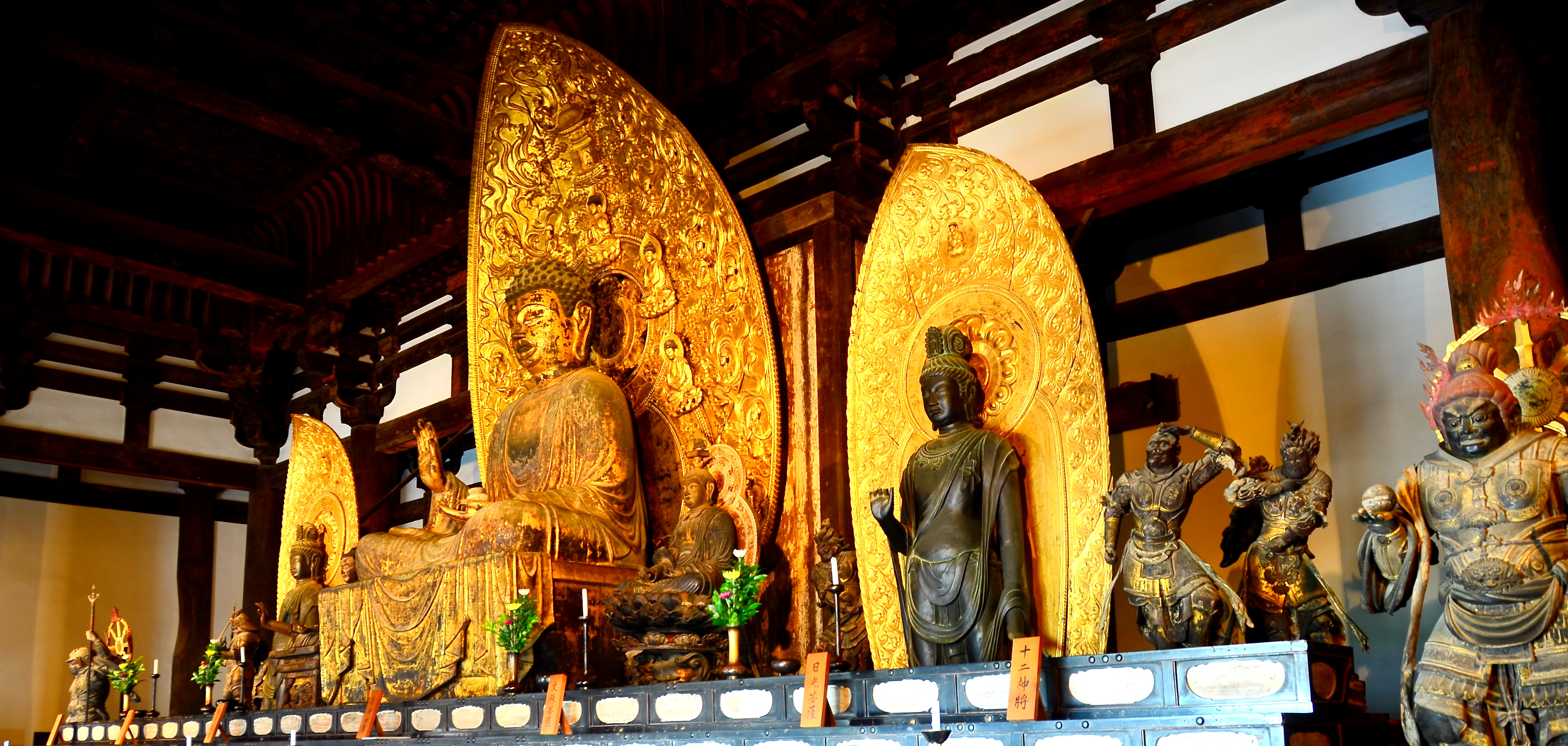
Golden Buddha in Kōfuku-ji inside Tō-kondō

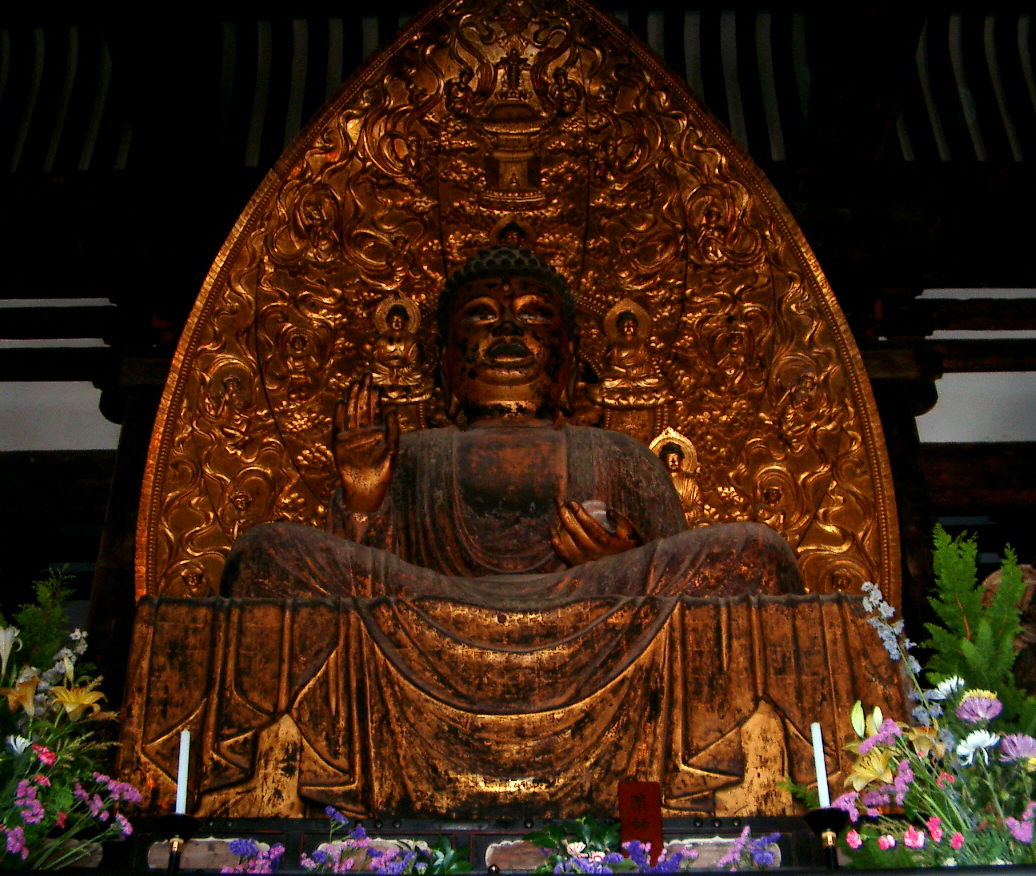
Yakushi Nyorai (Important Cultural Property) inside Tō-kondō

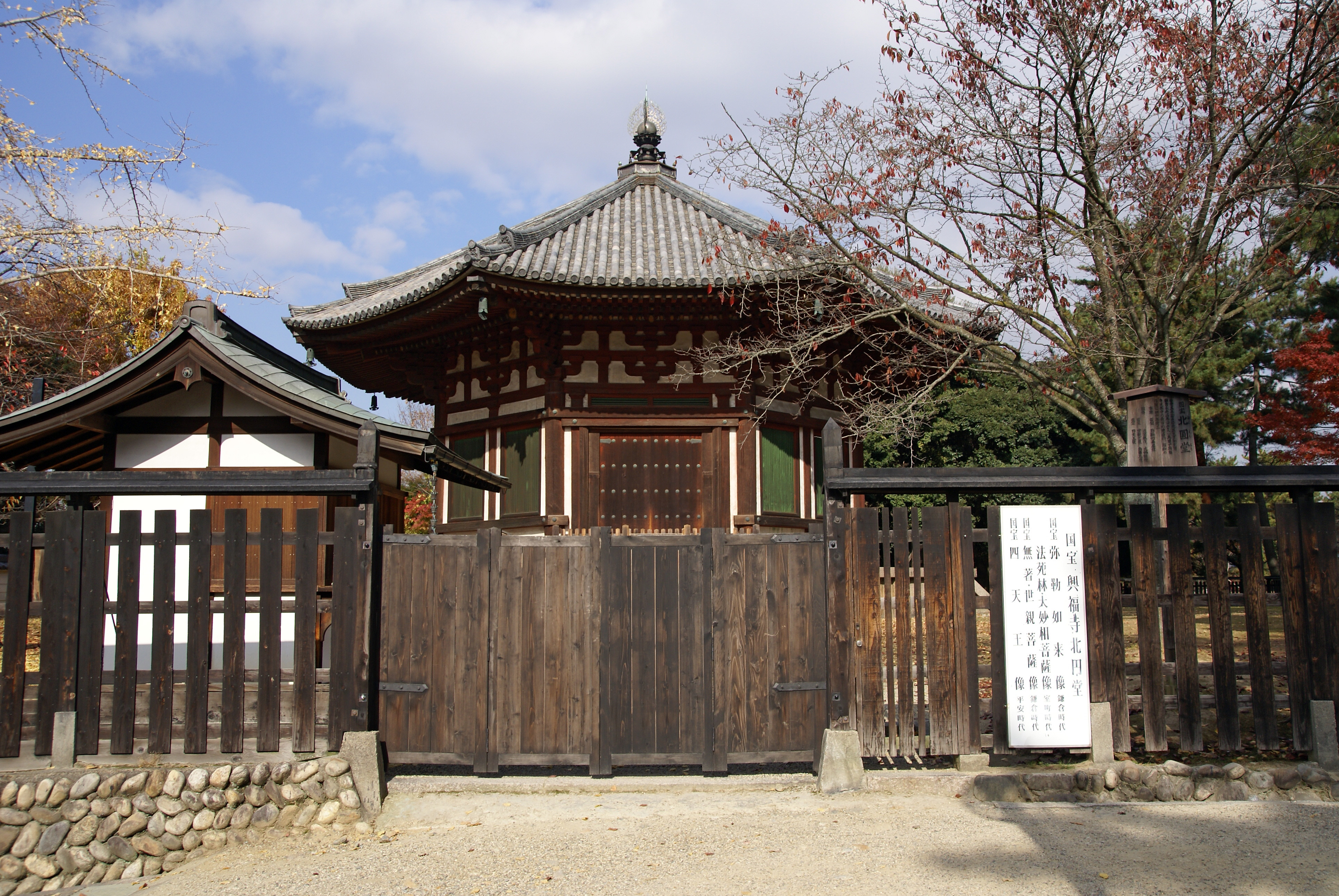
Hoku'endō, older of the two octagonal halls

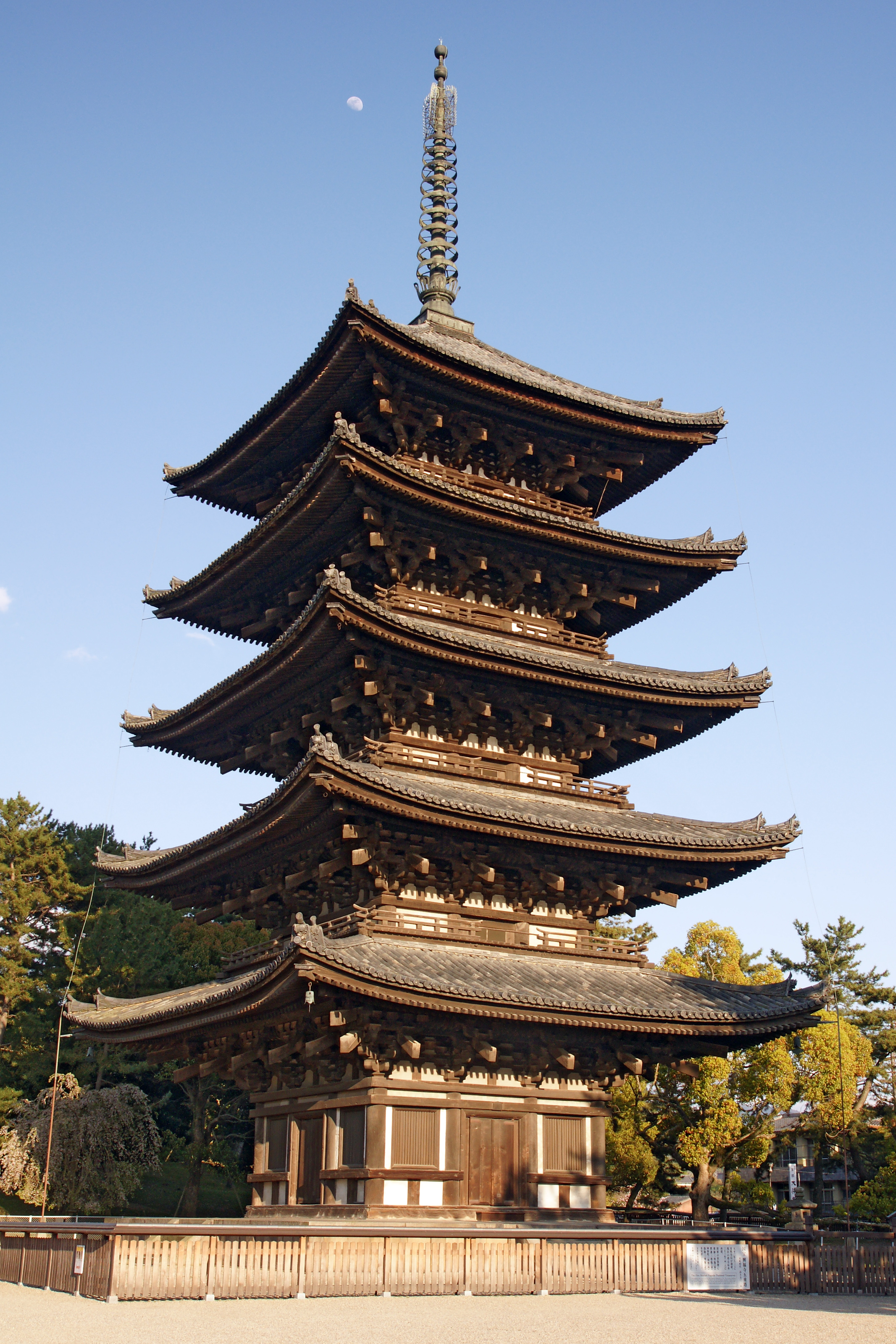
Gojū-no-tō five-storied pagoda

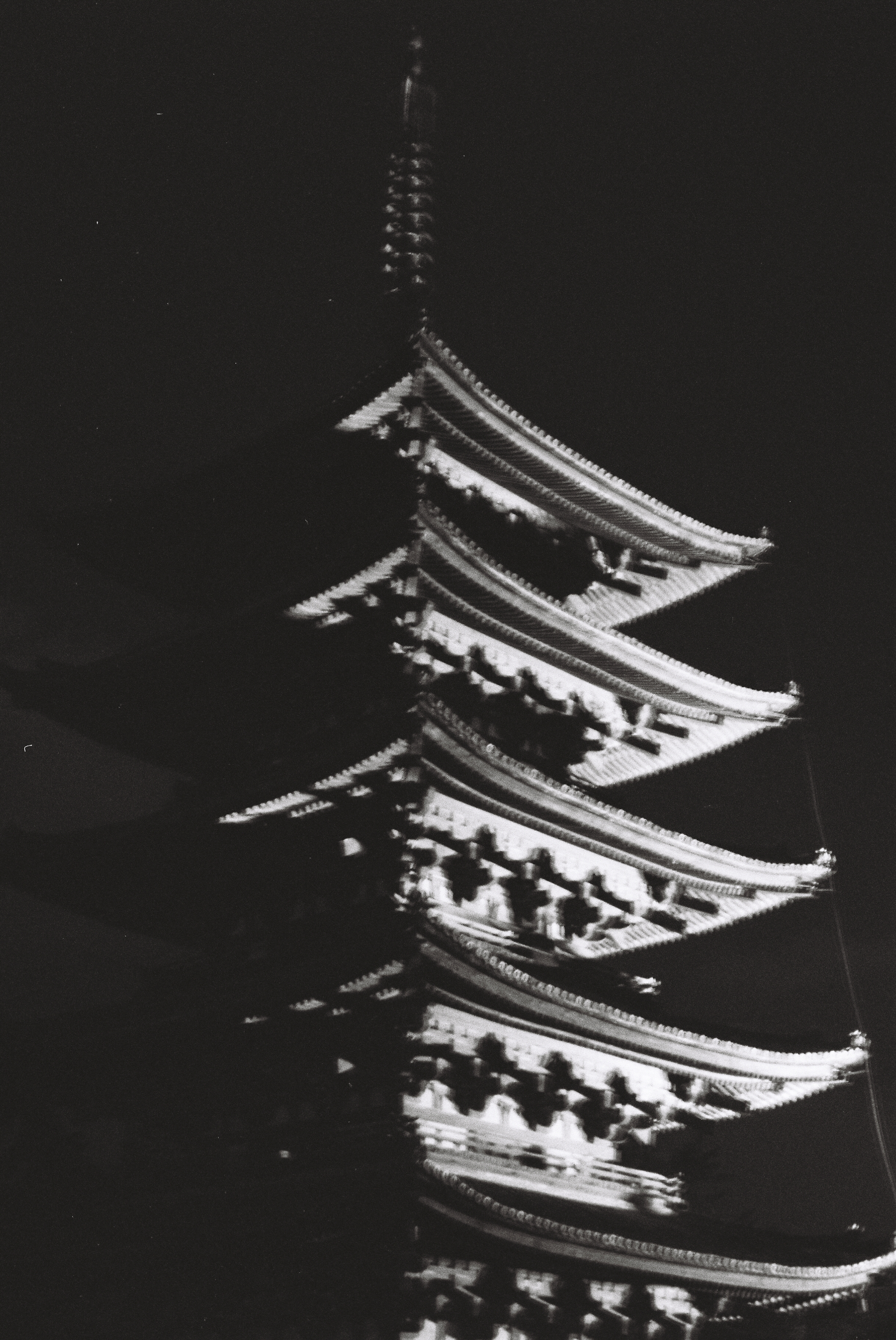
Pagoda at night

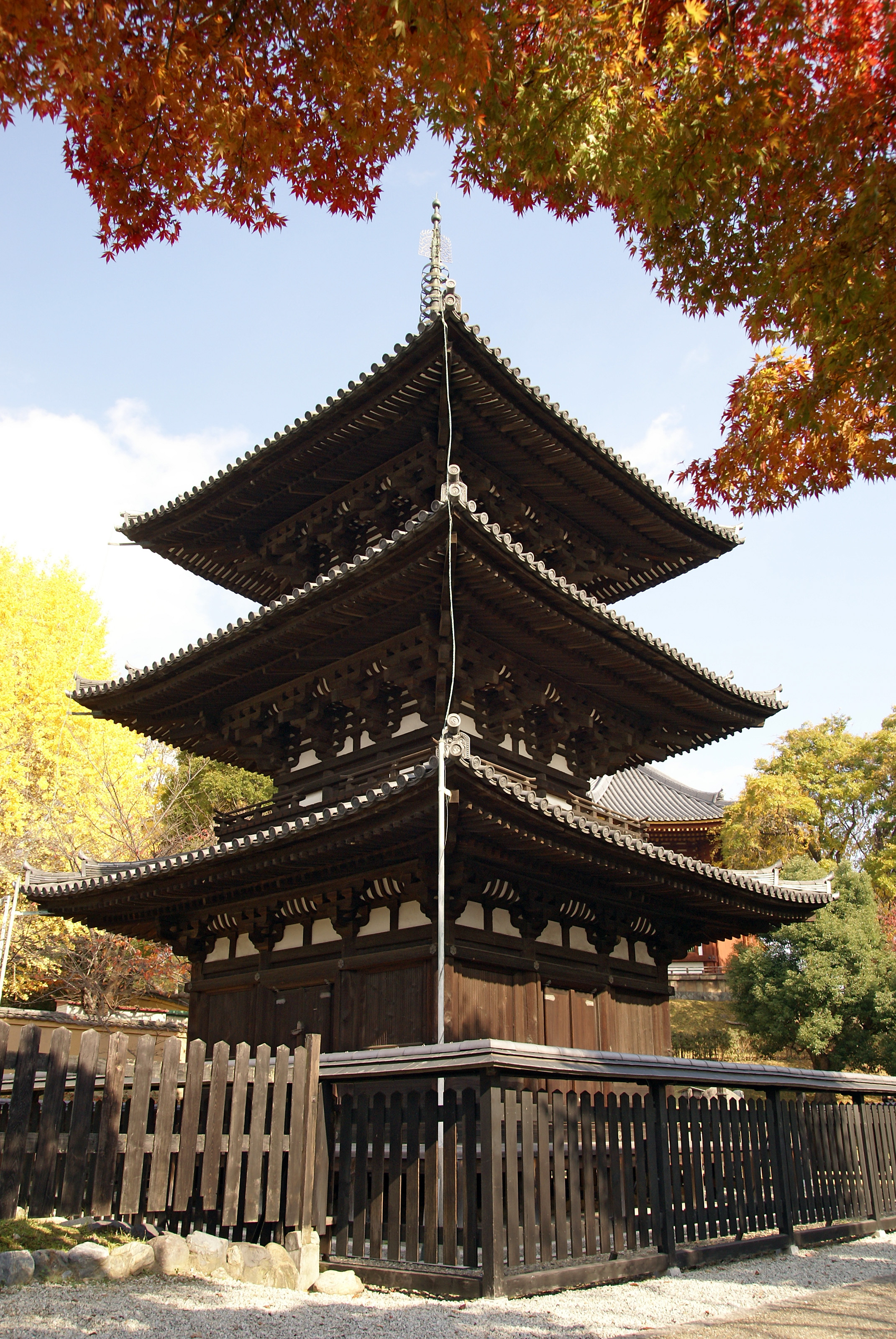
The Sanjū-no-tō stands behind Nan'endō

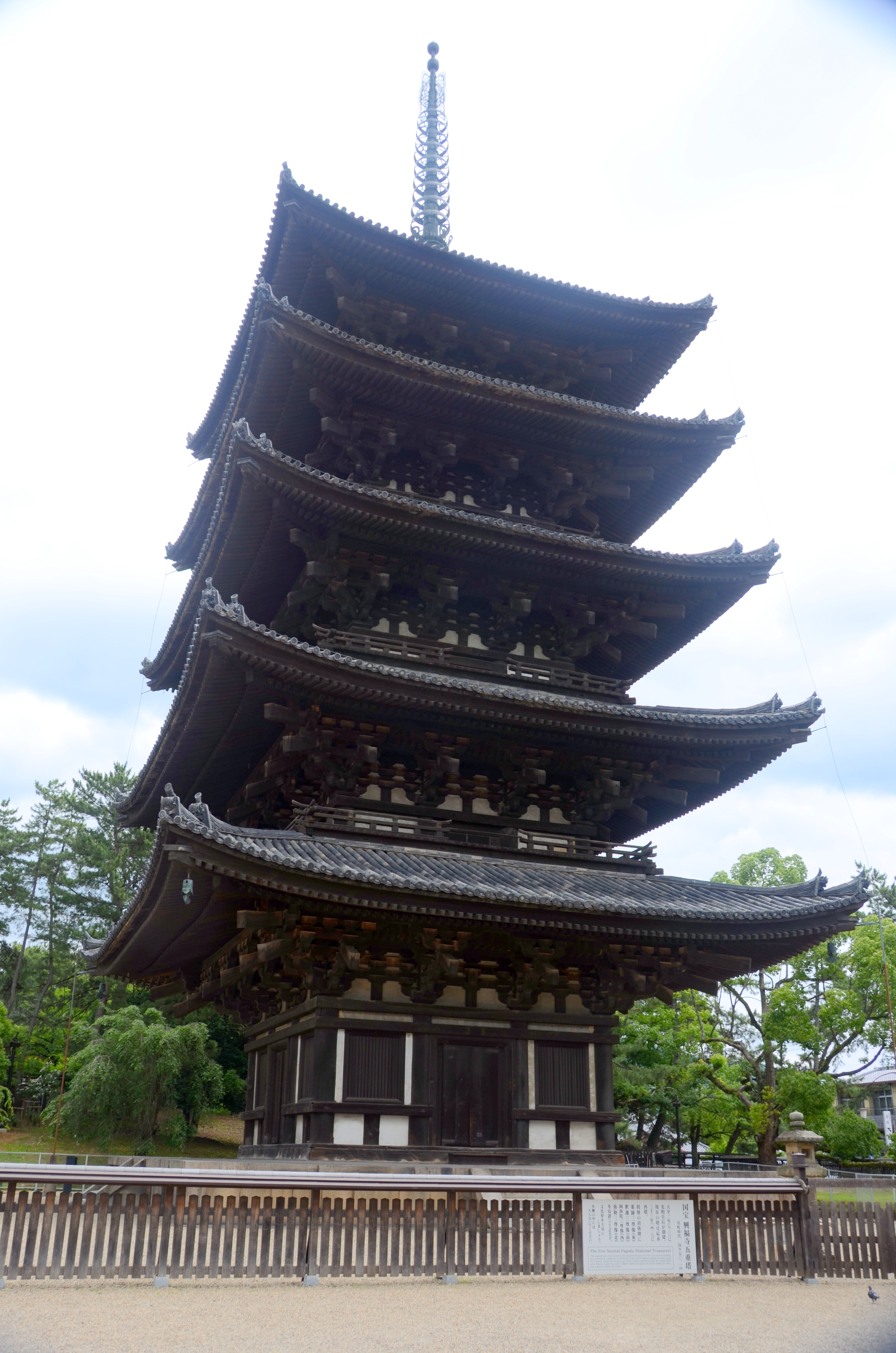
Gojū-no-tō five-storied pagoda from below

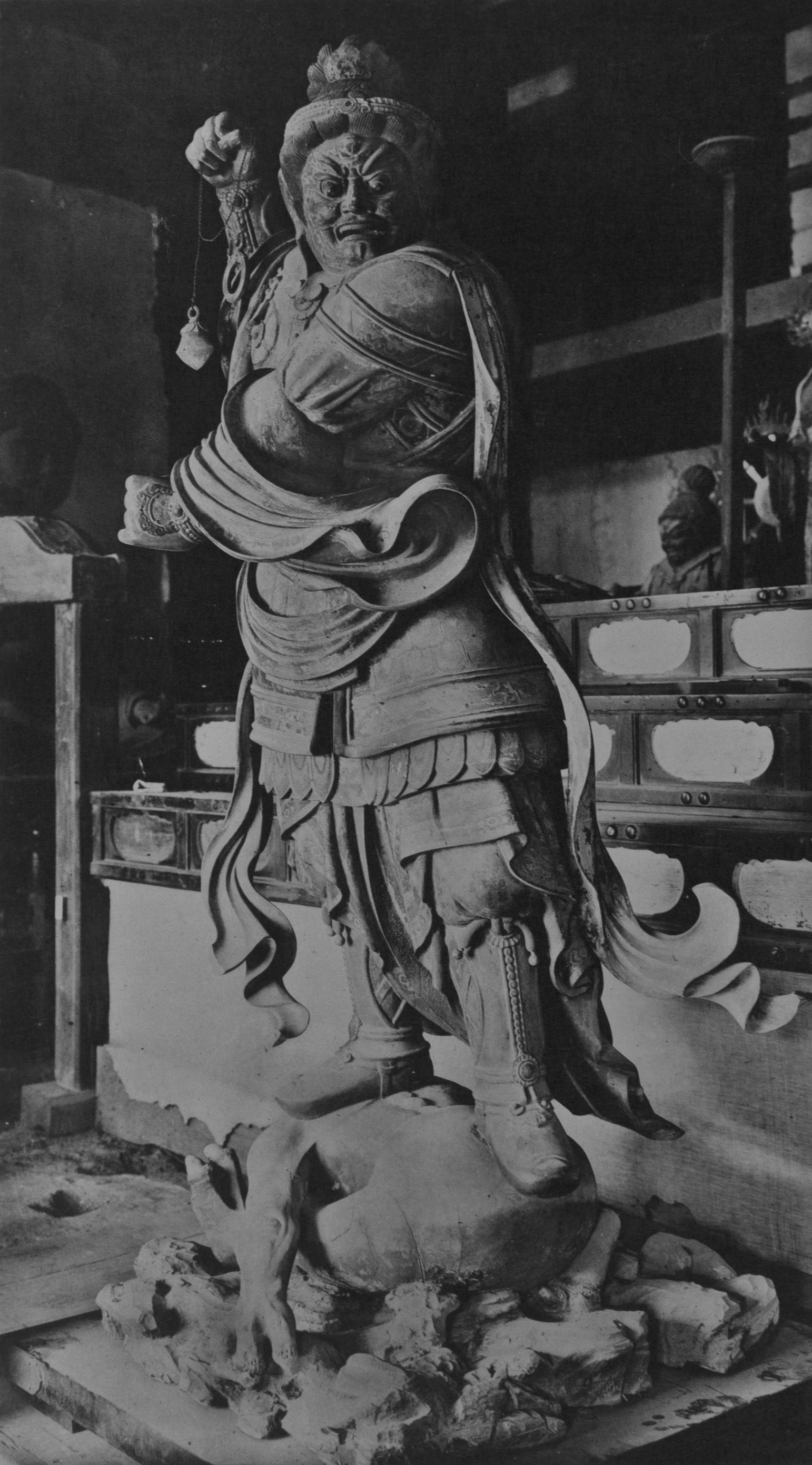
Virūpākṣa (Kōmokuten)

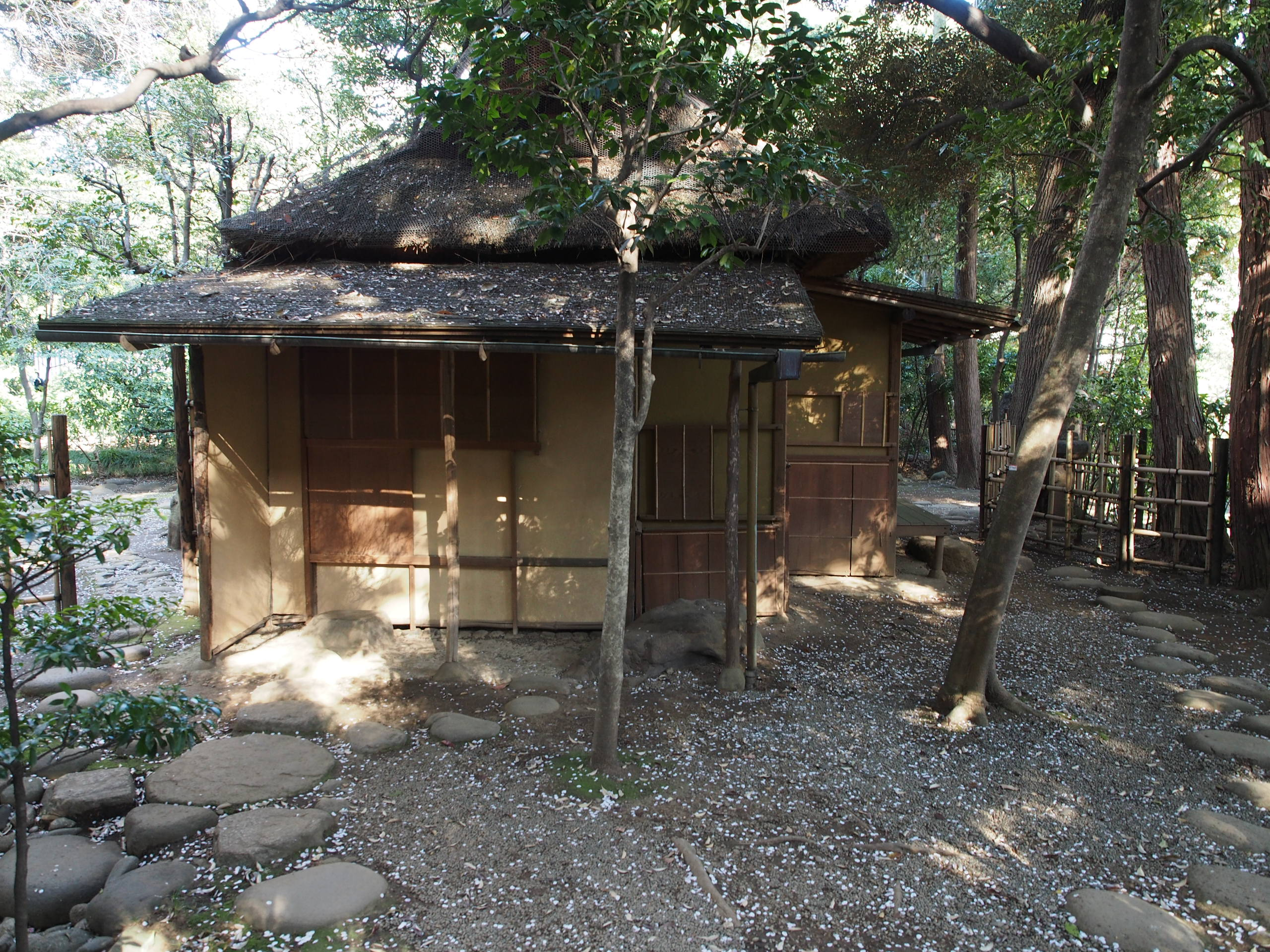
Rokusō-an tea house

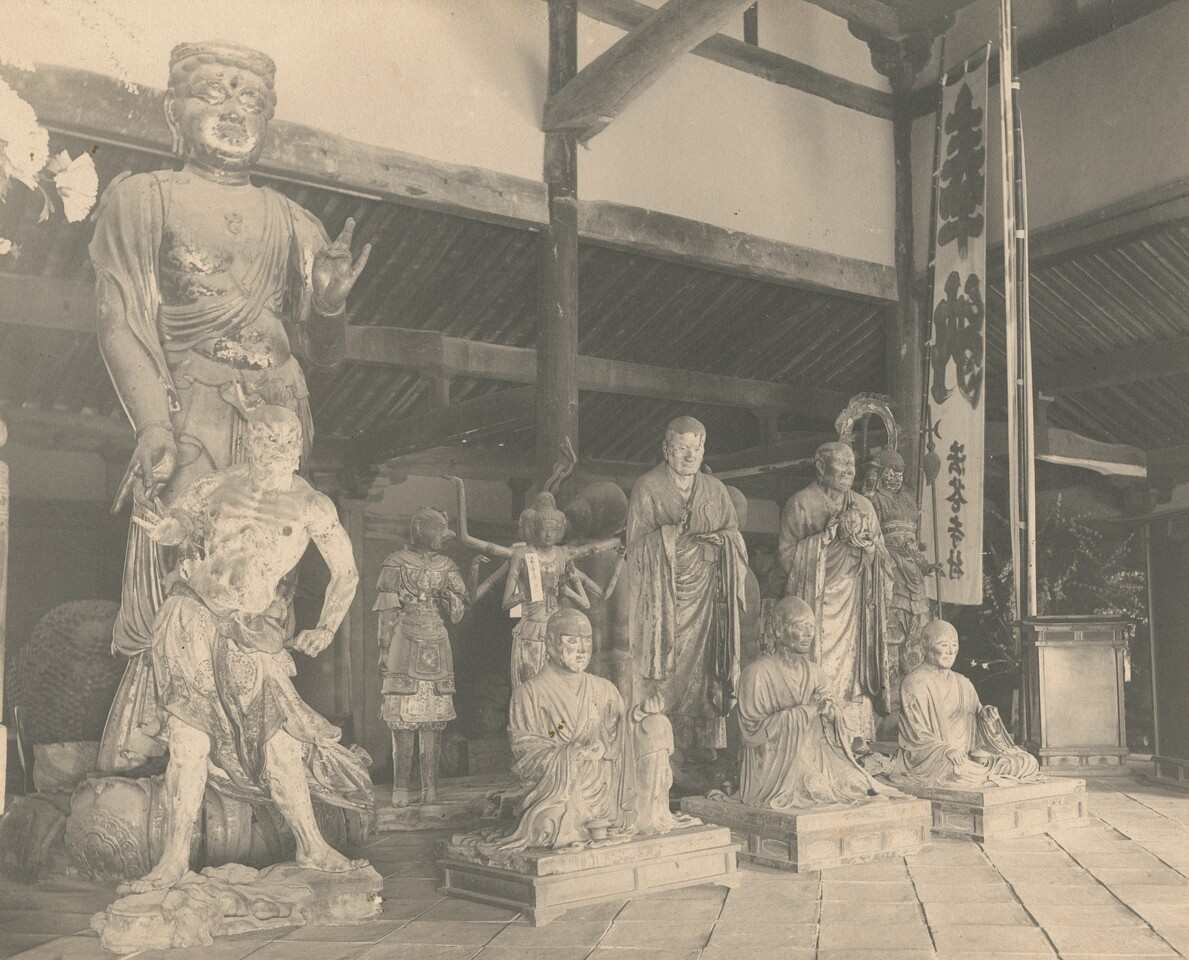
Collection of statues

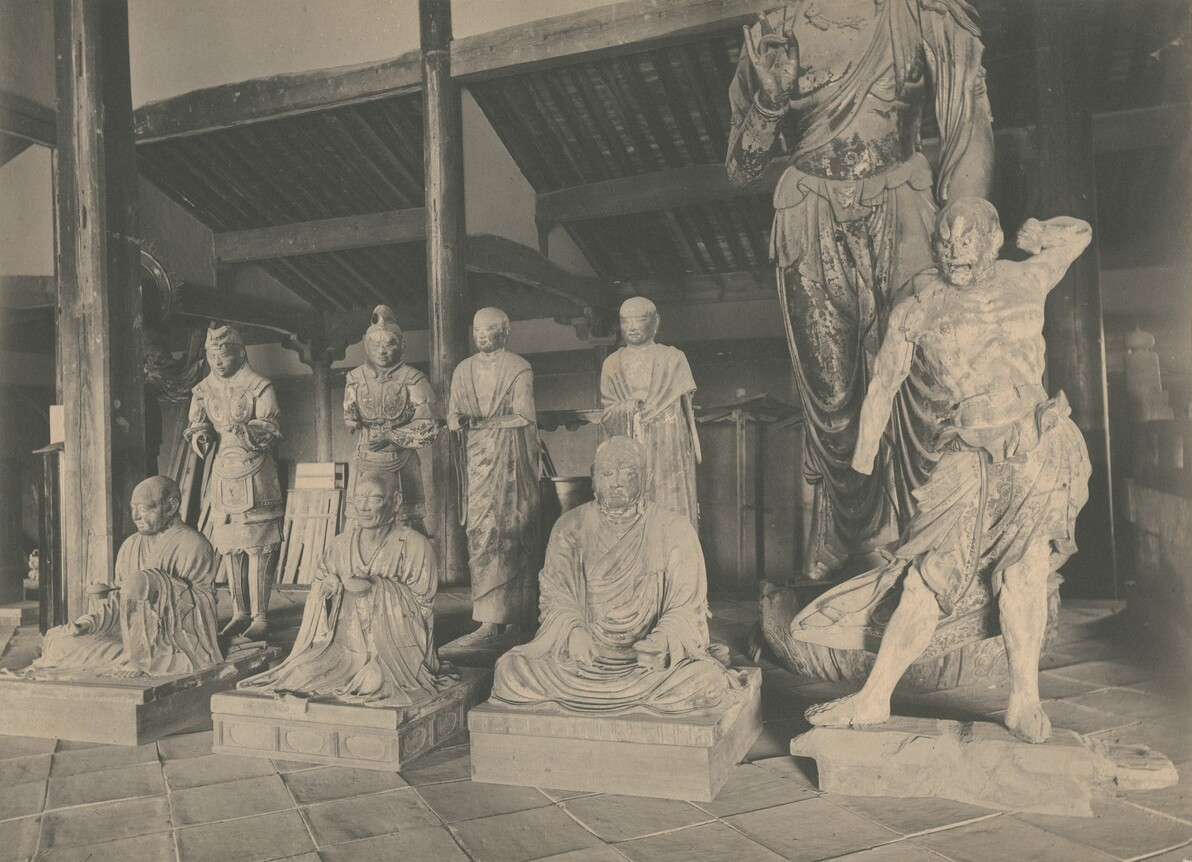
Collection of statues

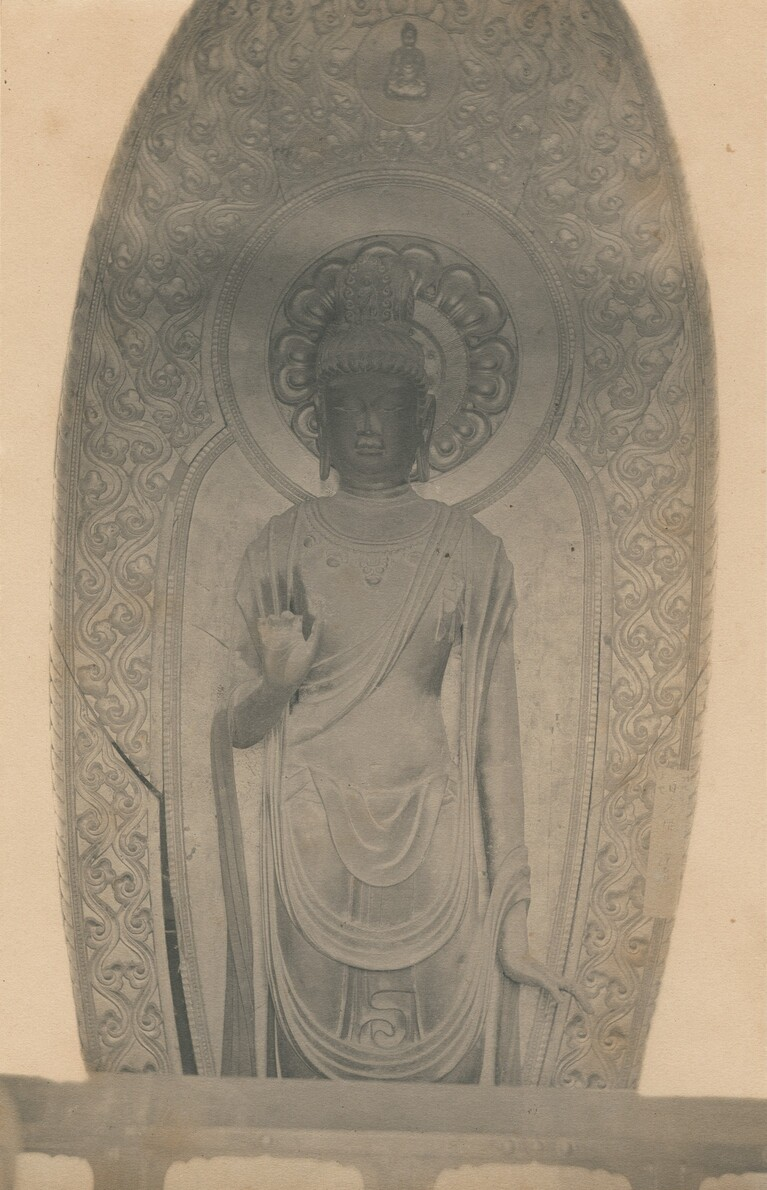
Amida Nyorai

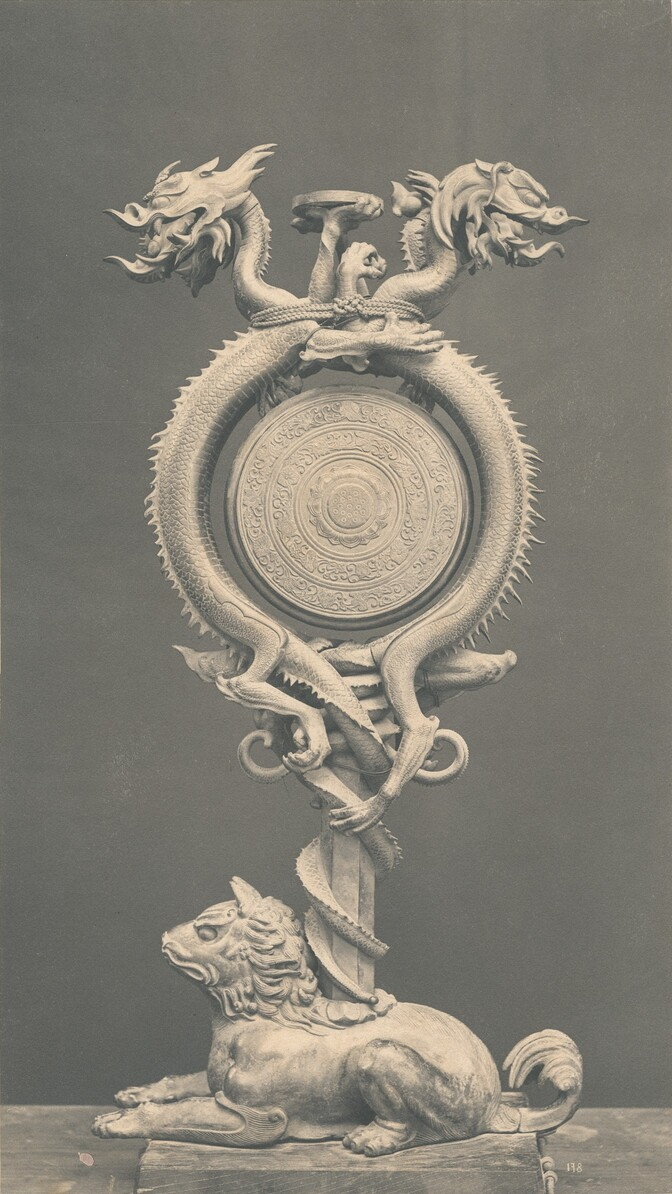
Kagenkei Gong

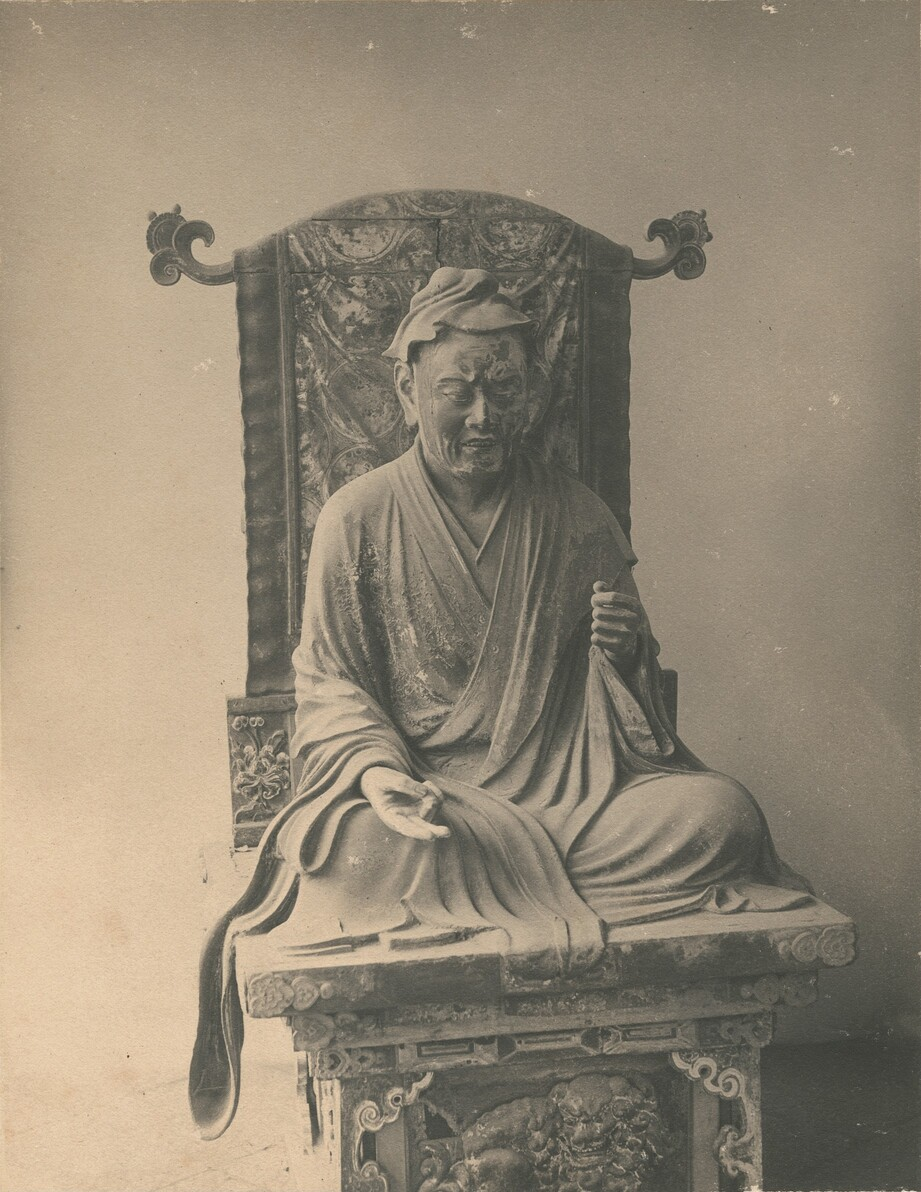
Yuima Koji

== See also ==
- List of National Treasures of Japan (archaeological materials)
- List of National Treasures of Japan (crafts-others)
- List of National Treasures of Japan (sculptures)
- List of National Treasures of Japan (temples)
- Siege of Nara

=== Sculptures formerly from Kōfuku-ji ===
- Boston Miroku - oldest sculpture made by the Busshi Kaikei, part of the temple's collection until 1906.
- Burke Jizō - sculpture by Kaikei, now a part of the Metropolitan Museum of Art
- Statue of Jizō (Intan) - another sculpture of Jizō, part of the MET.
- Statues of Brahmā and Indra - Nara period sculpture, now part of the Asian Art Museum (San Francisco)
- Seated Rāgarāja - a sculpture of Rāgarāja made in 1256 by the temple; now part of the Nara National Museum collection
- Four Heavenly Kings - one of the five sets of Four Heavenly Kings statues, dispersed between the temple, the Nara National Museum, and the Miho Museum

=== Works of art from Kōfuku-ji ===
- The Final Death of the Buddha Sakyamuni - Nanboku-chō painting depicting Parinirvana (1320-1340)
