= The Final Death of the Buddha Sakyamuni =

Japanese Parinirvana Painting in the Yale University Art Gallery

- Yale Parinirvana
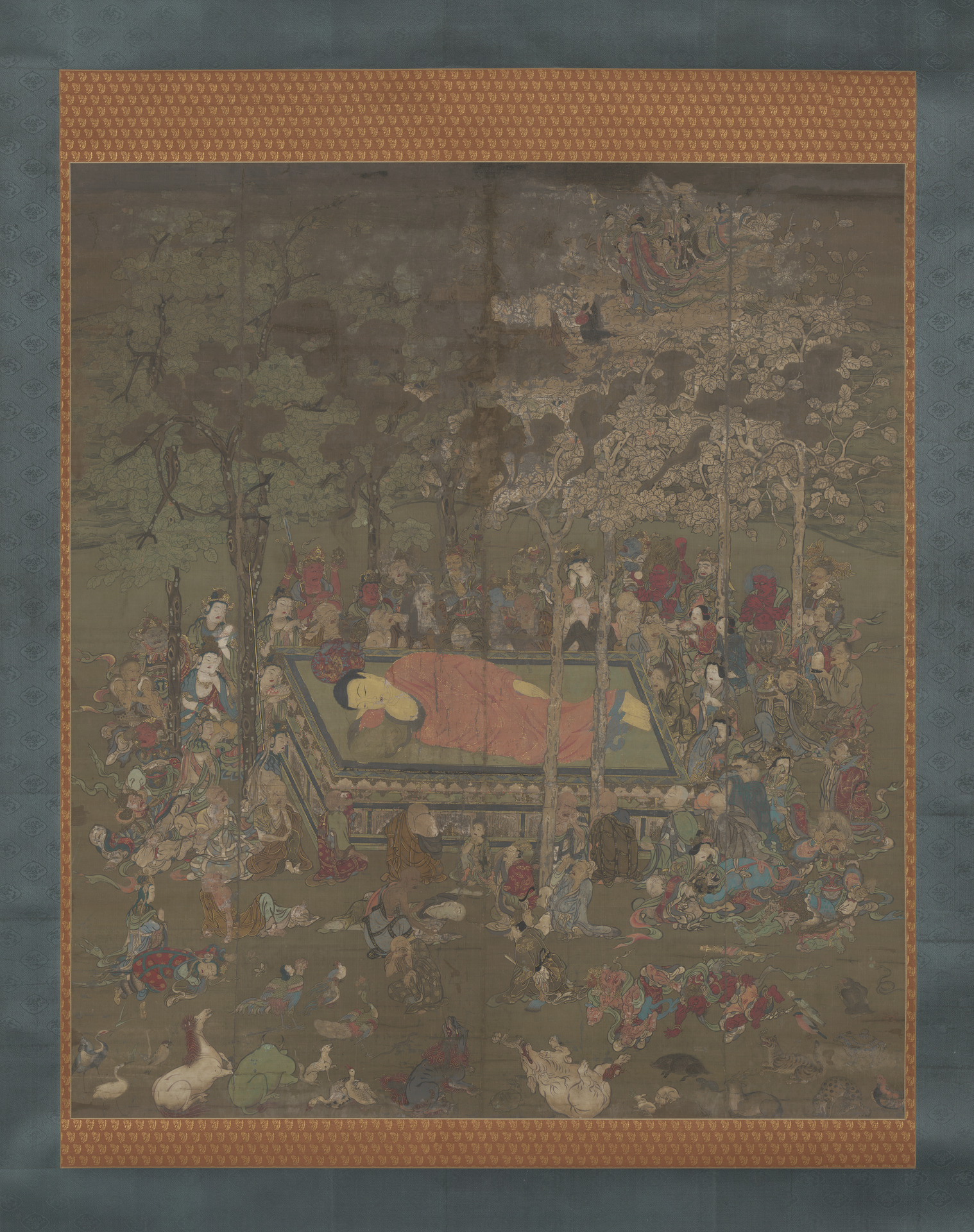
- Artist: Myōson
- Year: 1320–1340
- Medium: Silk painting
- Movement: Butsu-ga
- Subject: Parinirvana
- Dimensions: 176.5 cm × 293 cm (69 1/2 in × 115 3/9 in)
- Location: Yale University Art Gallery, New Haven, Connecticut
- Owner: Yale University
- Accession: 2005.58.1a-b
- Website: https://artgallery.yale.edu/collections/objects/104557

The Final Death of the Buddha Sakyamuni, or Yale Parinirvana (Nehan-zu), is a 14th-century Japanese silk painting and hanging scroll depicting the parinirvana of the Buddha. Painted by the artist Myōson, during the late Kamakura period to the Nanboku-chō period around 1320–1340, the painting served as part of a long line of Buddhist holiday observance of the parinirvana, also known as the Nirvana Service, or nehan-e, in mid-February.

Acquired with funds from The Japan Foundation Endowment of the Council on East Asian Studies, and the Leonard C. Hanna Jr. Fund, the painting has been part of the Yale University Art Gallery since 2005.

== Provenance ==
Painted by Myōson, the work can be traced to the Shōnami workshop, which operated under the Ichijōin office of Kōfuku-ji, in Nara. Multiple Parinirvana paintings are known attributed to him and his workshop, including one made for Myōho-ji in Hyōgo Prefecture in 1325 as well as one owned by Baron Fujita Heitarō.

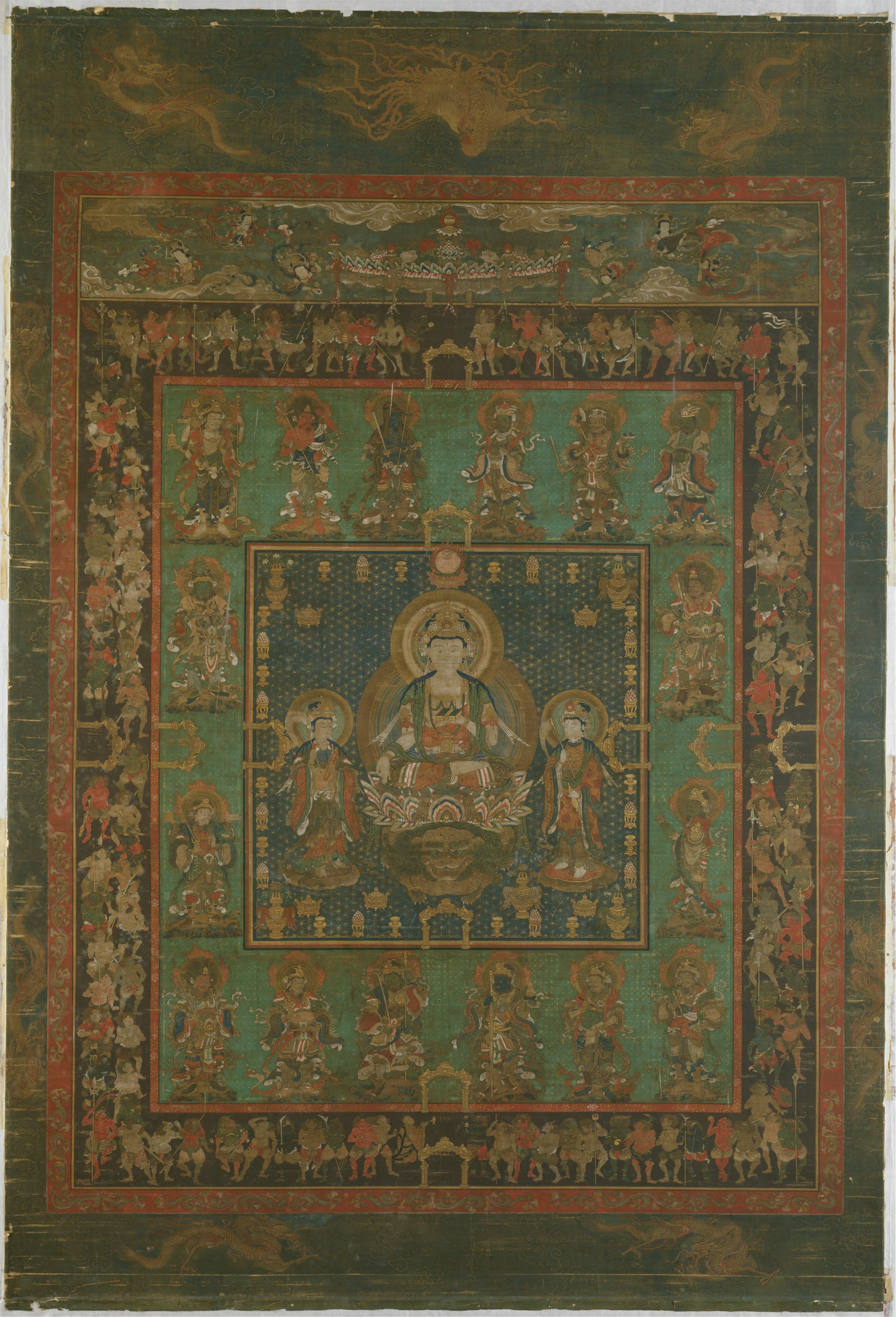
The Hannya Bosatsu Mandala, which was framed together with the Yale Parinirvana by Yamanaka & Co. (MET 2000.289)

The painting during the early 20th century, was sold through Yamanaka & Co. mounted together with a Hannya Bosatsu mandala from the Mary Griggs Burke collection, now owned by the Metropolitan Museum of Art.

Prior to its acquisition by Yale, the painting was owned by the "Colby Collection" from Los Angeles.

== Background ==
Since the Nara period, the Nirvana Service was primarily observed on the 15th day of the second month of the lunar calendar, at the main hall of a temple, accompanied by the painting of the Reclining Buddha, surrounded by mourners. The service is accompanied by hymns, chants and a lecture on the description of the painting.

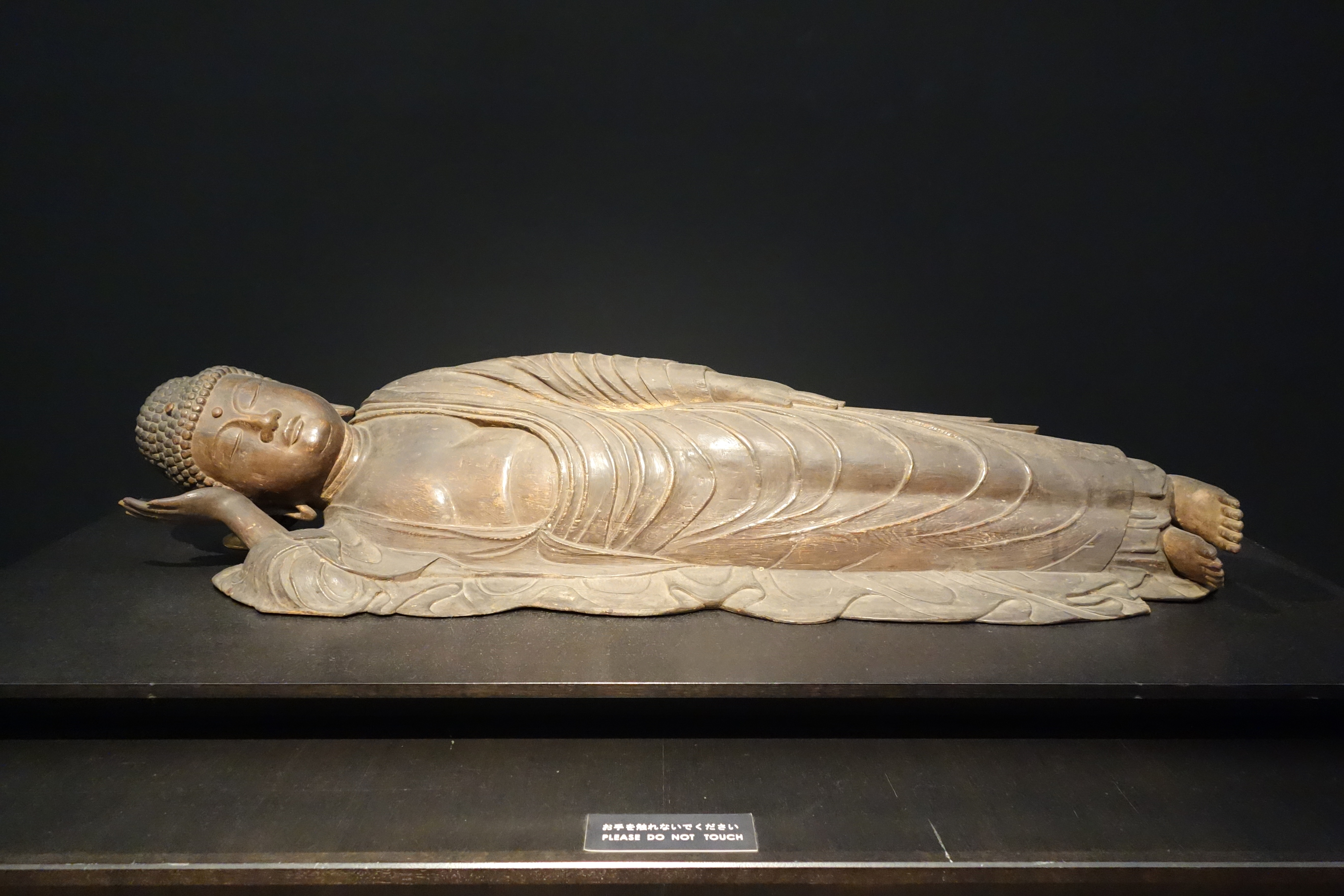
Reclining Buddha – Tokyo National Museum

Kōfuku-ji uses the hanging scroll as their primary format of the service, though during the Heian period, most temples utilized statuary as their primary format. Painting eventually gained popularity during the 11th century, officially called Butsu nehan-e (Pictures of the Parinirvâna of the Buddha), of which there were two styles: Type I, and Type II. Type I, popularized during the 11th and 12th centuries, focused on the reclining Buddha; Type II, of which the Yale Parinirvana is among them, focuses on the mourners and animals surrounding the Buddha for emphasis of emotional impact.

Type II during the career of the monk Myōe, who sought to reform the standardized teachings of the Buddhist establishment. Even then, the extant paintings amongst the type shows distinctions tied to specific temples and workshops.

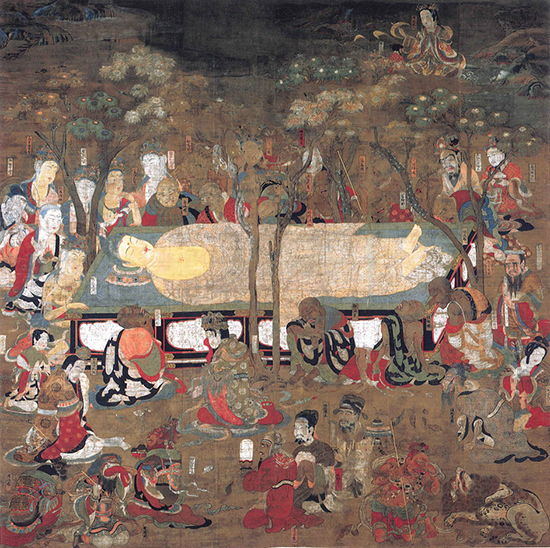
Buddha's Nirvana (絹本著色仏涅槃図, kenpon chakushoku butsunehan zu), Kongōbu-ji, 1086 (National Treasure), characteristic of Type I Parinirvana Painting.

Many subsequent paintings during the Muromachi period, such as that of Tōfuku-ji, Daitoku-ji, and artists like Hasegawa Tōhaku, proceeded to follow the conventions of the Type II conventions.

== Description ==
The Yale Parinirvana maintains the conventions of the Parinirvana scene, based upon the first chapter of the Mahāyāna Mahāparinirvāṇa Sūtra, where in Kushinagar, the disciples, mortals, royal patrons, and demons gather and mourn his passing.

Figures in the painting include his half-brother Nanda, the ascetic Subhadra, Ānanda (who lies fainted), the disciple Aniruddha, who tries with multiple attempts to revive him. On the front of the reclining couch, multiple bodhisattvas lie beside him, including Kṣitigarbha, dressed in soft-green monk robes, holding the cintamani and a staff. Behind the couch, Indra and retainer Vaiśravaṇa, a portable stupa in hand, stands behind him overcome with emotion. Even their adversaries, Vemacitrin are seen mourning besides them, framed by whitened trees, though his minions look on suspiciously.

Noted is that the painting on the upper right depicts Maya, the mother of the Buddha, who long since died, descending down from the heavens to oversee his passing, escorted by Aniruddha. The scale of the painting depicts people and entities who intersected with the Buddha in the past, present and future in order to converge at this one event.

The atmosphere and crowded details of the painting is scene to emulate the local aspect of 14th century Japanese street life, as if to emulate a "Kyoto street fair" with carnivalesque aesthetics.

Kṣitigarbha, or Jizo is seen not in mourning as he is prominently depicted in Japanese Buddhism as a figure who transverses the afterlife and rebirth, saving those who are lost.
