= Seated Rāgarāja (Nara National Museum) =

1256 statue of Rāgarāja

Aizen Myōō (Skt. Rāgarāja)
- 木造愛染明王坐像 (Japanese)
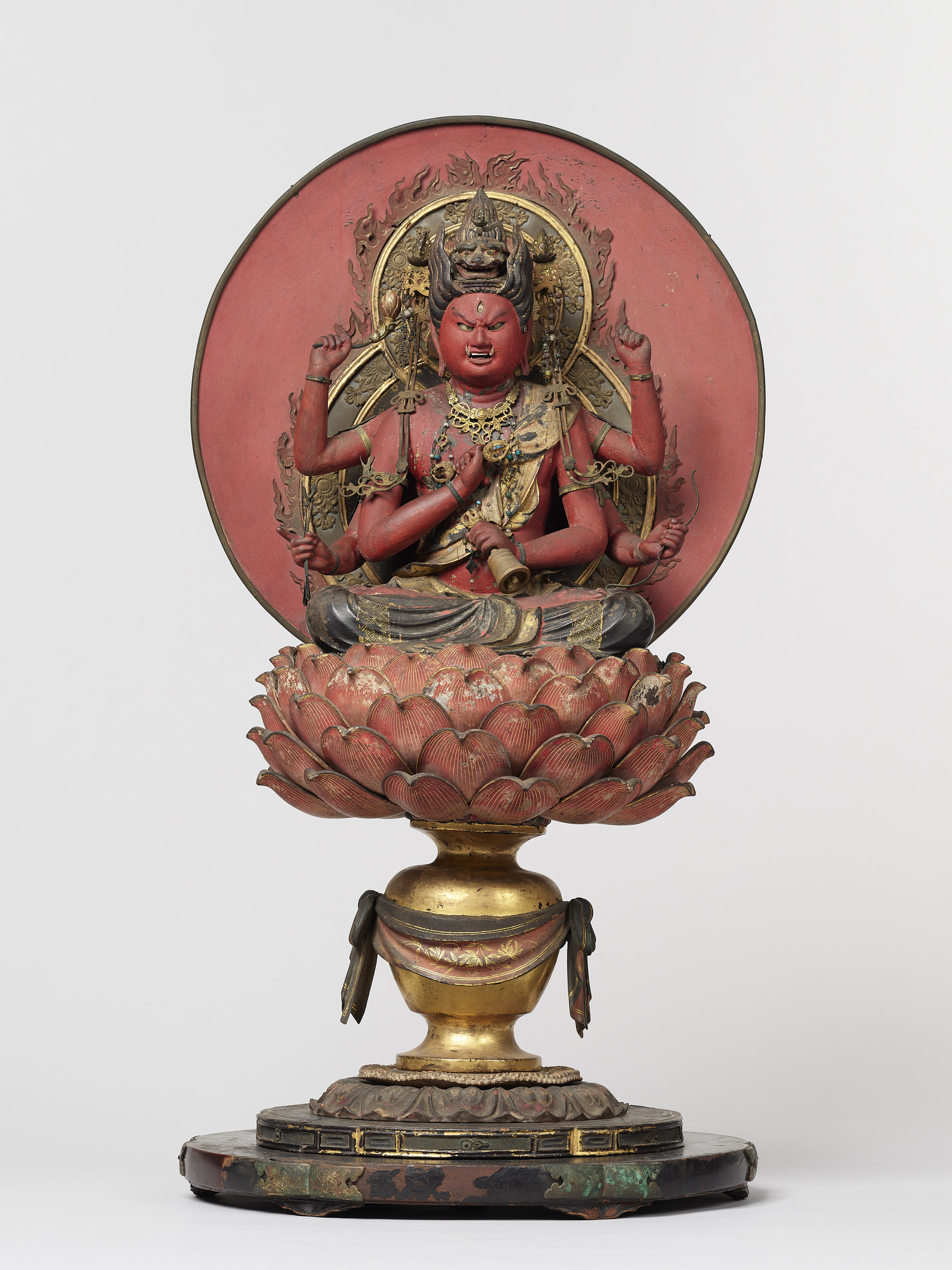
- Artist: Kaijō (Kaisei), Kaison, and Kaiben
- Year: 1256
- Catalogue: 03319
- Medium: Wooden sculpture
- Movement: Buddhist art in Japan
- Subject: Rāgarāja
- Dimensions: Statue: 26.2; Halo 30.3; Pedestal: 29.3 cm
- Designation: Important Cultural Property
- Location: Nara National Museum; Nara, Japan
- Accession: 958-2, 985-3
- Website: https://www.narahaku.go.jp/english/collection/958-2.html

Seated Rāgarāja or Seated Aizen Myō-ō (Japanese: 木造愛染明王坐像) is a Buddhist sculpture from the Kamakura period depicting the Wisdom King Rāgarāja (Aizen Myō-ō), carved in 1256 in the city of Nara, Japan. Constructed in the decades of restoration after the siege of Nara during the Genpei War using materials used for the reconstruction of the Daibutsuden in Tōdai-ji, the statue was once part of the pantheon at Kōfuku-ji until it was sold off by the temple during the Meiji era. It is currently owned by the Nara National Museum and is classified as an Important Cultural Property of Japan as an outstanding example of mid-Kamakura-period art.

== Description ==
The statue is of small stature, measuring around one shaku (30.3 cm) in height (height of statue: 26.2 cm, halo: 30.3 cm, pedestal: 29.3 cm). Rāgarāja is depicted in wrathful form, with intense red coloring, with six arms, three eyes, and fangs, seated on a red lotus in a vase. The red coloring is considered to symbolize sexual energy; in Esoteric Buddhism, as worshippers revere him as a figure who can turn sex to spiritual energy, therefore a means to escape suffering (Aizen, 愛染 transliterates to "dyed in love"). His hair is depicted on fire, with a bright red halo surrounding his body. On his head is adorned with a lion crown. The figure is jeweled with applied art, and kirikane patterning accentuates the clothing. The statue is considered to be pristine, with its original features intact. On the bottom of the statue is signature of the sculptor, Kaisei, who created it as part of the reconstruction of Nara's temples and statues.

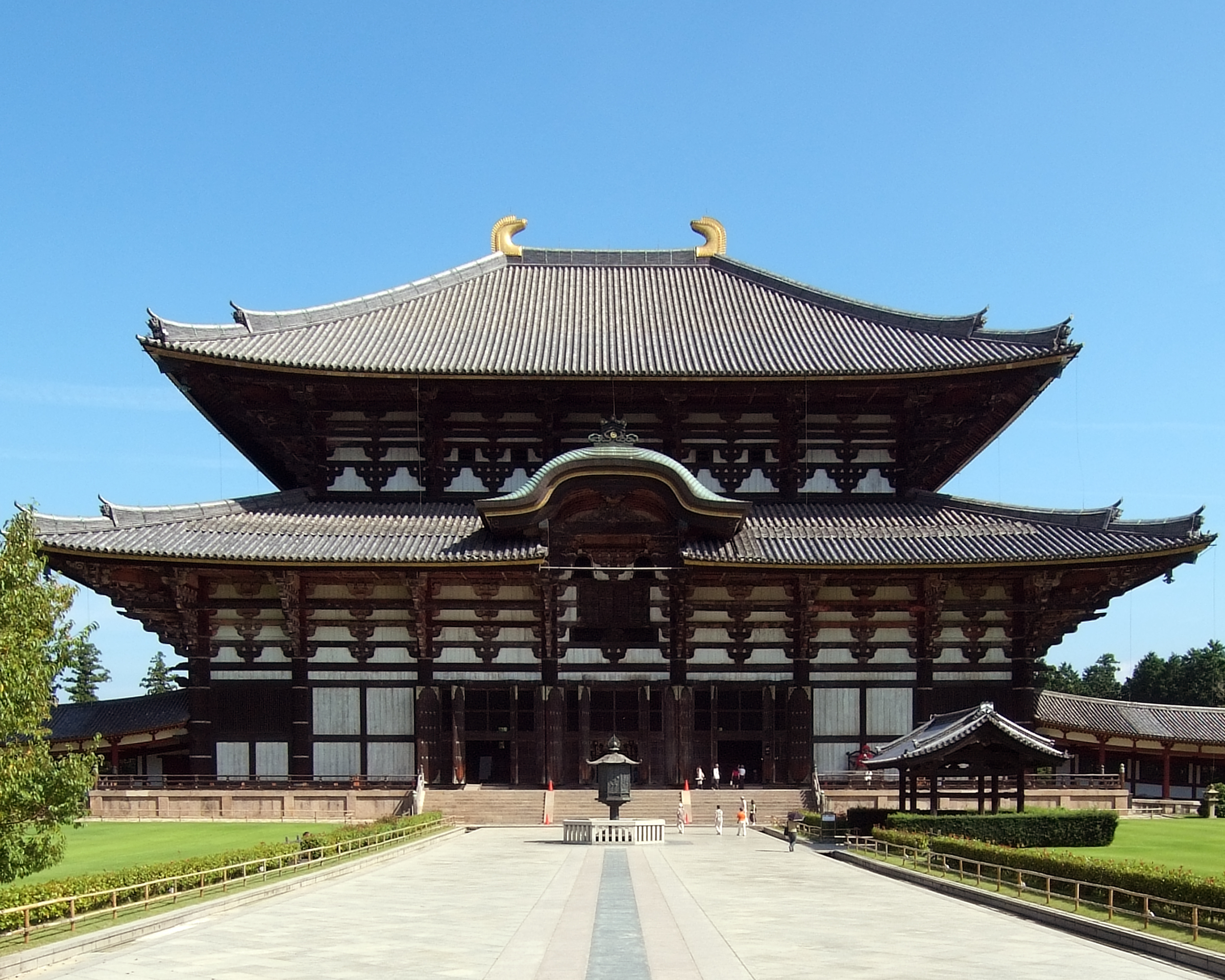
The present day Daibutsuden (Tōdai-ji), from which the sculpture's wood was derived

== Provenance ==
Kōfuku-ji and Tōdai-ji saw extensive damage during the Genpei War during the Siege of Nara in January 1180, which saw the city razed under the orders of Taira no Kiyomori by Taira no Shigehira. In the decades after the war, the temples underwent massive reconstruction under the sponsorship of the Kamakura shogunate and the Fujiwara clan (the latter of whom dominate Kōfuku-ji).

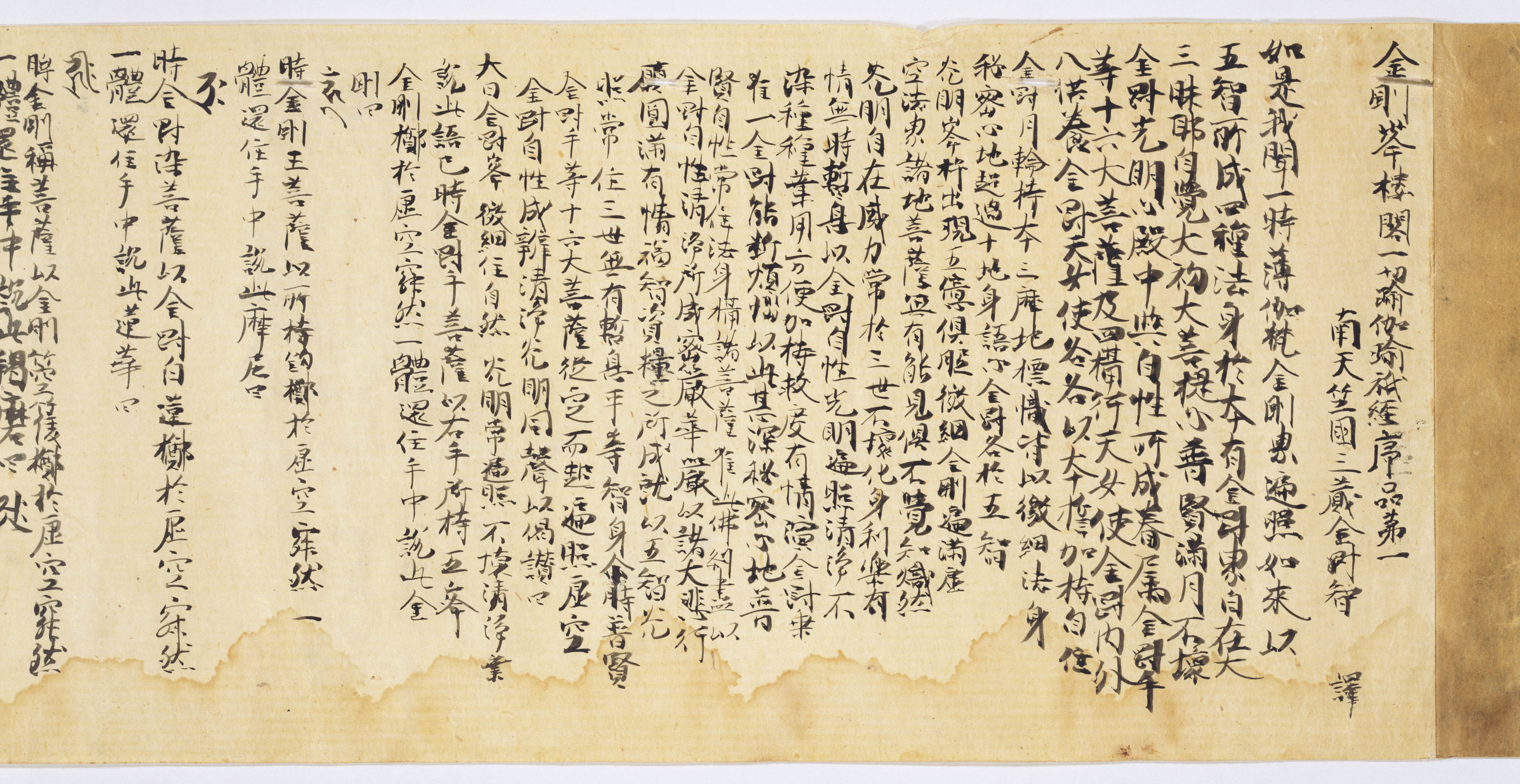
Kongōburōkakuissaiyugayugi-kyō, found deposited inside the statue, which attest to its origins and construction, 1256 (ICP)

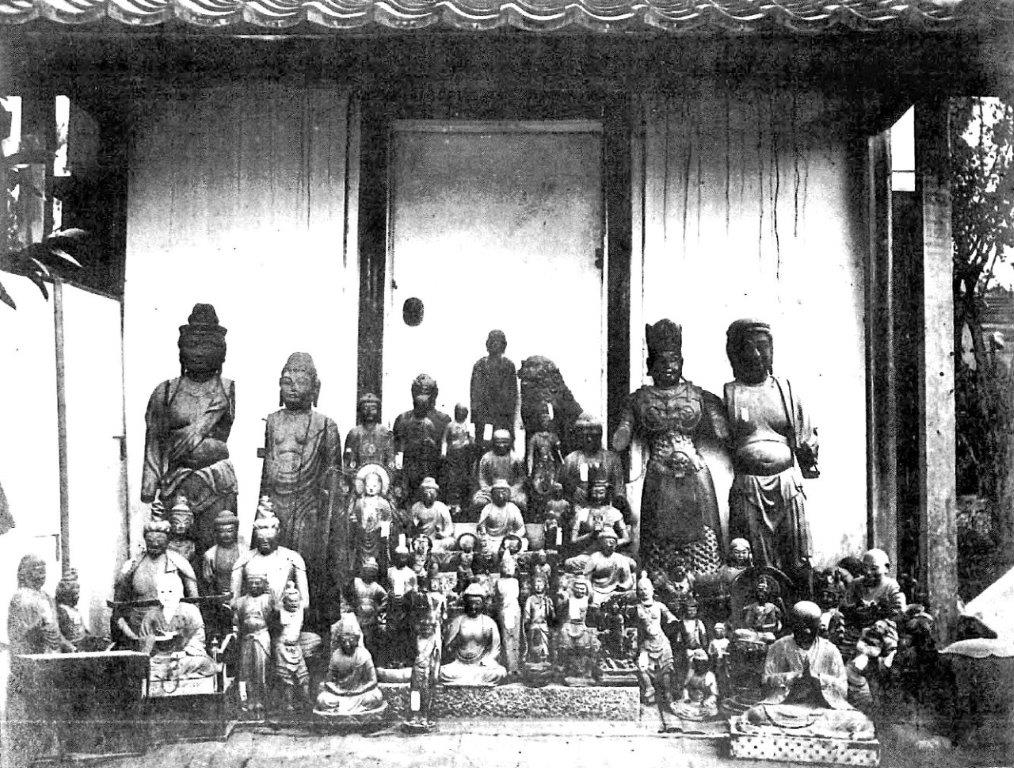
The Ragajara can be seen on the far right; displayed together with the Burke Jizō in the left center (MET).

The interior of the Seated Rāgarāja, contains a sutra scroll further information and insight on the reconstruction of the Daibutsuden in addition to the provenance of the statue. The scroll is a copy of the Sutra on All Yogas and Yogins of the Diamond Peak Pavilion (Japanese: 金剛峯楼閣一切瑜伽瑜祇経; Romaji: Kongōbu Rōkaku Issai Yuga Yugi Kyō; Pinyin: Jin’gang feng louge yiqie yujia yuqi jing), copied by the priest Jakuchō, a disciple of Eison who oversaw the restoration of Saidai-ji. The statue was carved in 1256 between the 12th day of the 3rd month to the 1st day of the 4th month of the 8th year of the Kenchō era, with the sutra inserted on the last day of the first month of Kenchō 8, or 27 February 1256. Its primary sculptor was Kaijō, with assistants Kaison and Kaiben completing the work.

On the bottom of the pedestal, the sculpture is inscribed, declaring that the materials were made from "a pillar that had been replaced at the front of Tōdaiji Temple’s Great Buddha Hall", which saw completion in 1195. Studies of the wood indicate that the statue was made with the original wood from the Daibutsuden that got burned during the siege.

The Daibutsuden debris was worked with at Zuigan-ji, a former temple in Yamashiro Province, present day Kamo, Kyoto. The statue was eventually deposited at Kōfuku-ji, whereupon it was identified in a 1906 photo along with a cache of statues, a result of the temple's fall from grace during the Meiji Restoration, due to shinbutsu bunri (separation of Japanese Buddhism and Shintoism) and haibutsu kishaku. What has been noted of the statue's deterioration was that a sword that it once carried has been partially broken off.

Unlike many other of Kōfuku-ji's sculptures that has been dispersed across many American museums, the Rāgarāja is owned by the Nara National Museum. On 11 June 1977, the Agency for Cultural Affairs designated the sculpture as an Important Cultural Property under designated number 03319.
