= Parinirvana =

Concept in Buddhism

Translations of Parinirvana
- English: Nirvana after death, Nirvana without remainder, Nirvana without residue
- Sanskrit: परिनिर्वाण (IAST: parinirvāṇa)
- Pali: parinibbāna
- Burmese: ပရိနိဗ္ဗာန် (MLCTS: pa.ri.nibban)
- Chinese: 般涅槃 (Pinyin: bōnièpán)
- Indonesian: parinirwana
- Japanese: 般涅槃 (Rōmaji: hatsunehan)
- Khmer: បរិនិព្វាន (UNGEGN: bârĭnĭpvéan)
- Korean: 반열반 (RR: banyeolban)
- Lao: ປະລິນິພພານ (palinipphan)
- Sinhala: පරිනිර්වාණය (parinirvāṇaya)
- Tagalog: pawinilbana
- Tibetan: མྱང་འདས། (myang 'das)
- Thai: ปรินิพพาน (RTGS: parinipphan)

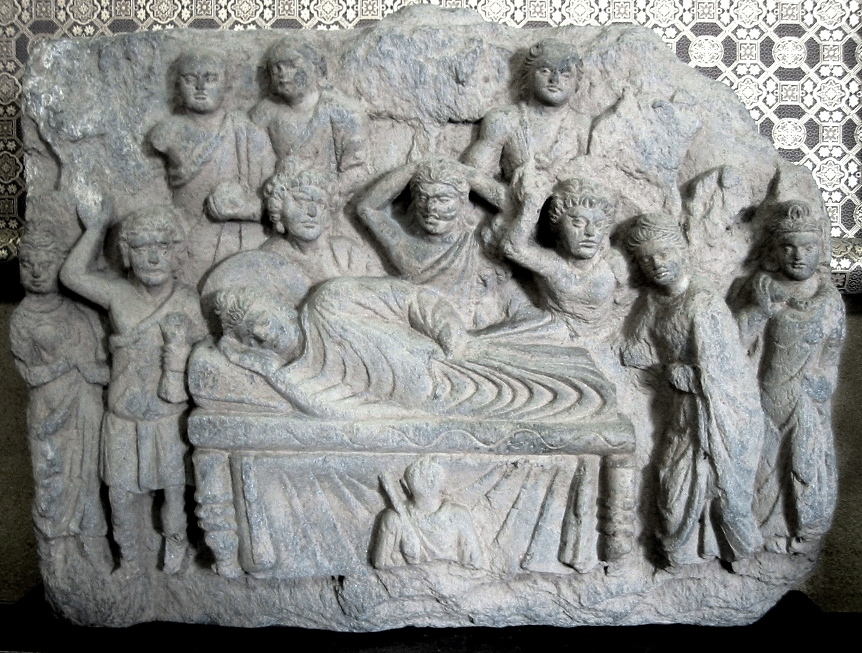
The death of the Buddha (Gautama Buddha), or Mahaparinirvana. Gandhara, 2–3rd century

In Buddhism, parinirvana (Sanskrit: parinirvāṇa; Pali: parinibbāna) describes the state entered after death by someone who has attained nirvana during their lifetime. It implies a release from samsara, karma and rebirth as well as the dissolution of the skandhas.

In some Mahāyāna scriptures, notably the Mahāyāna Mahāparinirvāṇa Sūtra, parinirvāṇa is described as the realm of the eternal true Self of the Tathāgata.

In Buddhist art, the event is represented by a reclining Buddha figure, often surrounded by disciples.

== Final nirvana at death ==
In the Buddhist view, when ordinary people die, each person's unresolved karma passes on to a new birth; and thus, the karmic inheritance is reborn in one of the Six Paths of samsara. However, when a person attains nirvana, they are liberated from karmic rebirth. When such a person dies, it is the end of the cycle of rebirth. Contemporary scholar Rupert Gethin explains:

Eventually, 'the remainder of life' will be exhausted and, like all beings, such a person must die. But unlike other beings, who have not experienced 'nirvāṇa', he or she will not be reborn into some new life, the physical and mental constituents of being will not come together in some new existence, there will be no new being or person. Instead of being reborn, the person 'parinirvāṇa-s', meaning in this context that the five aggregates of physical and mental phenomena that constitute a being cease to occur. This is the condition of 'nirvāṇa without remainder [of life]' (nir-upadhiśeṣa-nirvāṇa/an-up ādisesa-nibbāna): nirvāṇa that comes from ending the occurrence of the aggregates (skandha/khandha) of physical and mental phenomena that constitute a being; or, for short, khandha-parinibbāna. Modern Buddhist usage tends to restrict 'nirvāṇa' to the awakening experience and reserve 'parinirvāṇa' for the death experience.

== Parinirvana of Buddha Shakyamuni ==
Buddha attaining Parinirvana – Depicted in Cave 26 of Ajanta Caves – India

Accounts of the purported events surrounding the Buddha's (Gautama Buddha's) parinirvāṇa are found in a wide range of Buddhist canonical literature. In addition to the Pāli Mahāparinibbāna sutta (DN 16) and its Sanskrit parallels, the topic is treated in the Saṃyutta-nikāya (SN 6.15) and the several Sanskrit parallels (T99 p253c-254c), the Sanskrit-based Ekottara-āgama (T125 p750c), and other early sutras preserved in Chinese, as well as in most of the Vinayas preserved in Chinese of the early Buddhist schools such as the Sarvāstivādins and the Mahāsāṃghikas. The historical event of the Buddha's parinirvāṇa is also described in several later works, such as the Sanskrit Buddhacarita, the Avadāna-śataka, and the Pāli Mahāvaṃsa.

According to Bareau, the oldest core components of all these accounts are just the account of the Buddha's parinirvāṇa itself at Kuśinagara and the funerary rites following his death. He deems all other extended details to be later additions with little historical value.

=== Within the Mahaparinibbana Sutta (Pali) ===
The parinirvāṇa of the Buddha is described in the Mahaparinibbana Sutta. Because of its attention to detail, this Theravada sutta, though first committed to writing hundreds of years after his death, has been resorted to as the principal source of reference in most standard studies of the Buddha's life.

=== Within the Mahāyāna Mahāparinirvāṇa sūtra ===
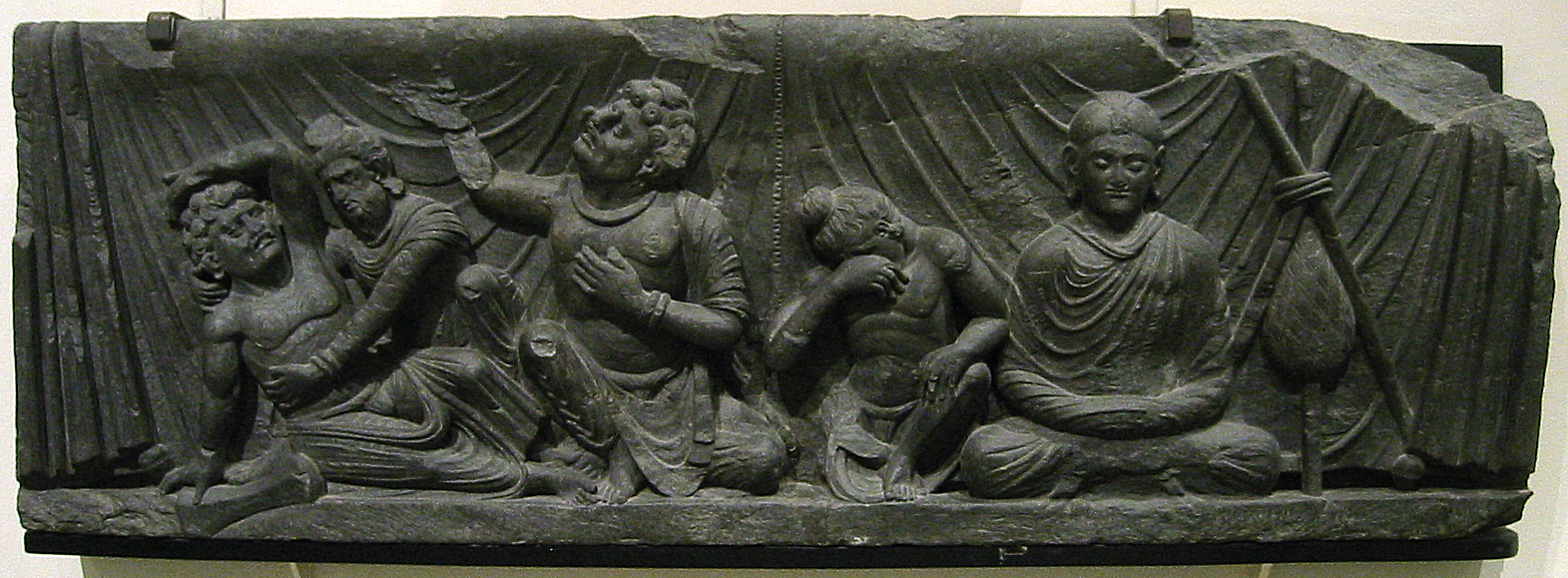
Attendants to the Parinirvana, Gandhara, Victoria and Albert museum

In contrast to these works which deal with the Buddha's parinirvāṇa as a biographical event, the Mahāyāna Mahāparinirvāṇa Sūtra was written hundreds of years later. The Nirvana Sutra does not give details of the historical event of the day of the parinirvāṇa itself, except the Buddha's illness and Cunda's meal-offering, nor any of the other preceding or subsequent incidents, instead using the event as merely a convenient springboard for the expression of standard Mahayana ideals such as the Tathagata-Garbha / Buddha-Dhatu doctrine, the eternality of the Buddha, and the soteriological fate of the Icchantikas and so forth.

=== Location of Gautama Buddha's death and parinirvana ===
It has been suggested by Waddell that the site of the death and parinirvāṇa of the Buddha was in the region of Rampurva: "I believe that Kusīnagara, where the Buddha died may be ultimately found to the North of Bettiah, and in the line of the Aśōka pillars which lead hither from Patna (Pāțaliputra)" in Bihar. It still awaits proper archaeological excavation.

== In Mahayana literature ==
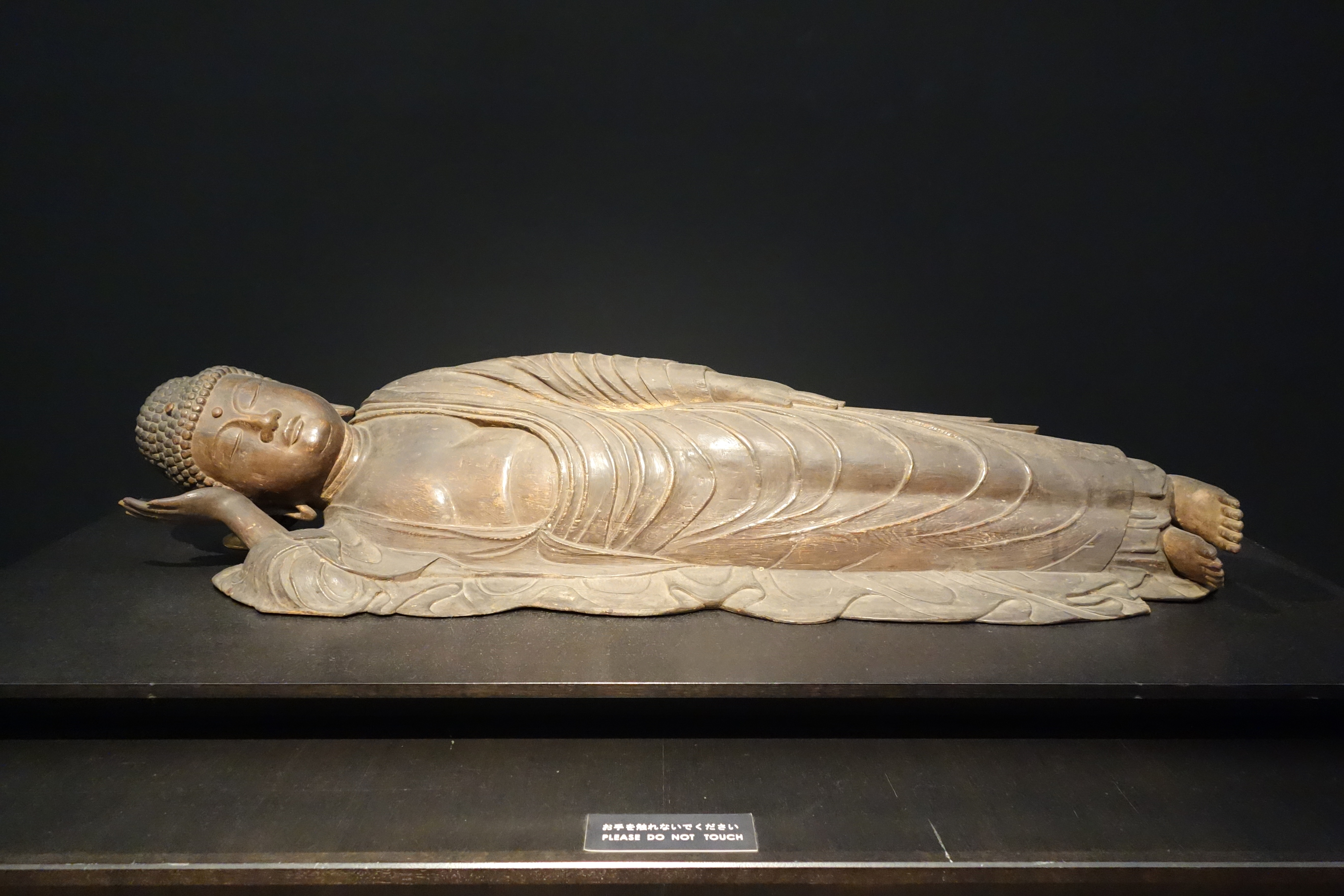
Buddha's parinirvana (death of Sakyamuni), Kamakura period, 13th century, wood. Tokyo National Museum

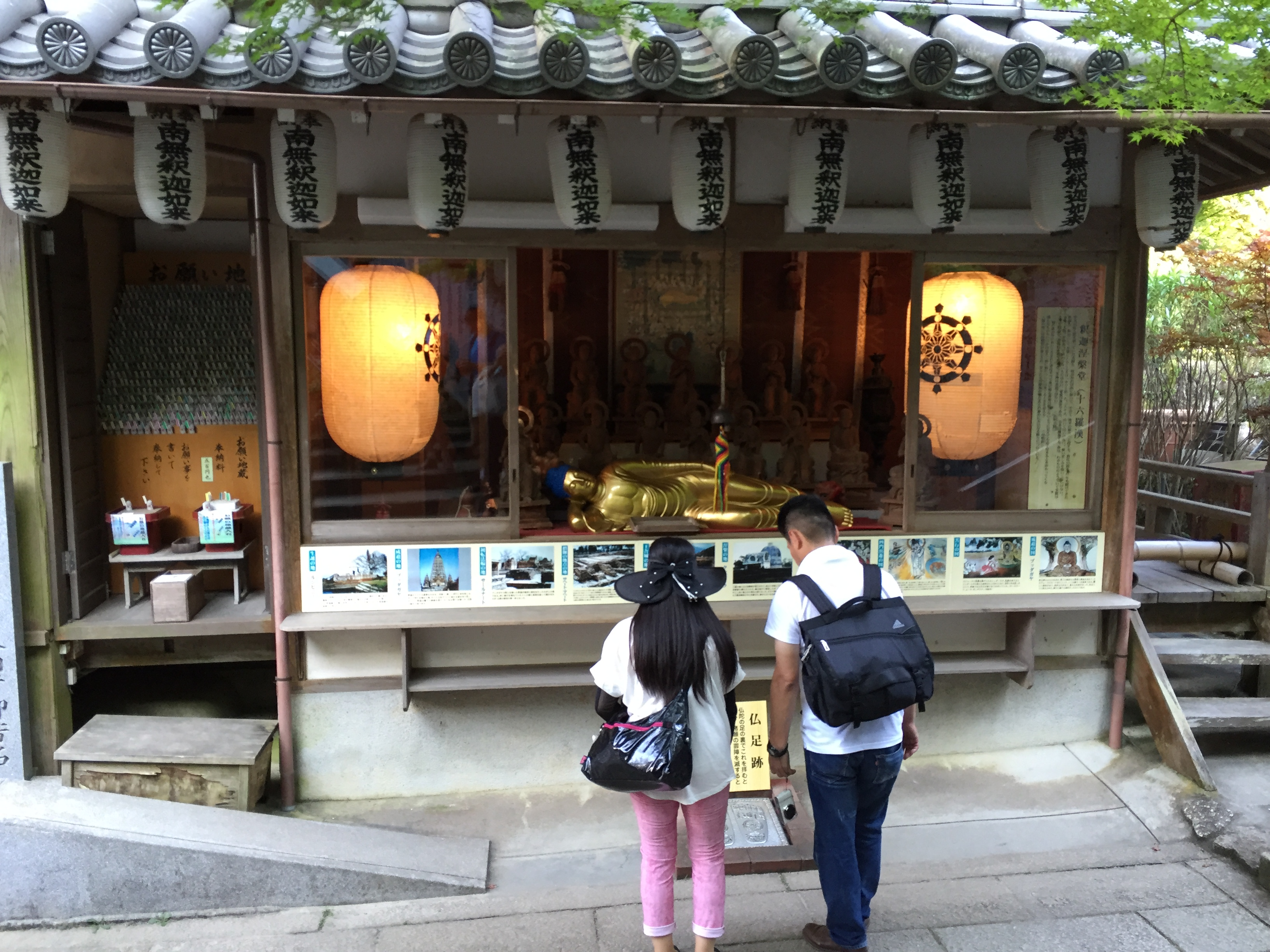
Parinirvana Shrine, Miyajima, Japan

According to the Mahāyāna Mahāparinirvāṇa Sūtra (also called the Nirvana Sutra), the Buddha taught that parinirvāṇa is the realm of the Eternal, Bliss, the Self, and the Pure. Paul Williams states that it depicts the Buddha using the term "Self" to win over non-Buddhist ascetics. However, the Mahaparinirvana Sutra is a long and highly composite Mahayana scripture, and the part of the sutra upon which Williams is basing his statement is a portion of the Nirvana Sutra of secondary Central Asian provenance - other parts of the sutra were written in India.

Guang Xing speaks of how the Mahayanists of the Nirvana Sutra understand the mahaparinirvana to be the liberated Self of the eternal Buddha:

One of the main themes of the MMPS [Mahayana Mahaparinirvana Sutra] is that the Buddha is eternal ... The Mahayanists assert the eternity of the Buddha in two ways in the MMPS. They state that the Buddha is the dharmakaya, and hence eternal. Next, they reinterpret the liberation of the Buddha as mahaparinirvana possessing four attributes: eternity, happiness, self and purity.

Only in Mahaparinirvana is this True Self held to be fully discernible and accessible.

Kosho Yamamoto cites a passage in which the Buddha admonishes his monks not to dwell inordinately on the idea of the non-self but to meditate on the Self. Yamamoto writes:

Having dwelt upon the nature of nirvana, the Buddha now explains its positive aspect and says that nirvana has the four attributes of the Eternal, Bliss, the Self, and the Pure ... the Buddha says: "O you bhiksus [monks]! Do not abide in the thought of the non-eternal, sorrowful, non-Self, and the not-pure and have things as in the case of those people who take the stones, wooden pieces, and gravel for the true gem [of the true Dharma] ... In every situation, constantly meditate upon the idea of the Self, the idea of the Eternal, Bliss, and the Pure ... Those who, desirous of attaining Reality, meditatively cultivate these ideas, namely, the ideas of the Self [atman], the Eternal, Bliss, and the Pure, will skilfully bring forth the jewel, just like the wise person."

Michael Zimmermann, in his study of the Tathagatagarbha Sutra, reveals that not only the Mahaparinirvana Sutra but also the Tathagatagarbha Sutra and the Lankavatara Sutra speak affirmatively of the Self. Zimmermann observes:

The existence of an eternal, imperishable self, that is, Buddhahood, is the basic point of the TGS [Tathagatagarbha Sutra] ... the Mahaparinirvanasutra and the Lankavatarasutra characterize the tathagatagarbha explicitly as atman [Self].

== See also ==
- Mahasamādhi
- Parinirvana Day
- Prabashvara
- Reclining Buddha
- The Final Death of the Buddha Sakyamuni

== Sources ==
- Gethin, Rupert (1998), Foundations of Buddhism, Oxford University Press
- Goldstein, Joseph (2011), One Dharma: The Emerging Western Buddhism, HarperCollins, Kindle Edition
- Goleman, Daniel (2008), Destructive Emotions: A Scientific Dialogue with the Dalai Lama, Bantam, Kindle Edition
- Harvey, Peter (1990), Introduction to Buddhism, Cambridge University Press
- Harvey, Peter (1995), The Selfless Mind: Personality, Consciousness and Nirvāṇa in Early Buddhism, Routledge, ISBN 0-7007-0338-1
- Keown, Damien (2000), Buddhism: A Very Short Introduction, Oxford University Press, Kindle Edition
- Lama Surya Das (1997), Awakening the Buddha Within, Broadway Books, Kindle Edition
- Lopez, Donald S. (2001), The Story of Buddhism, HarperCollins
- Traleg Kyabgon (2001), The Essence of Buddhism, Shambhala
- Williams, Paul (2002), Buddhist Thought, Taylor & Francis, Kindle Edition
- Walpola Rahula (2007), What the Buddha Taught, Grove Press, Kindle Edition
