= Sadajirō Yamanaka =

Japanese art dealer

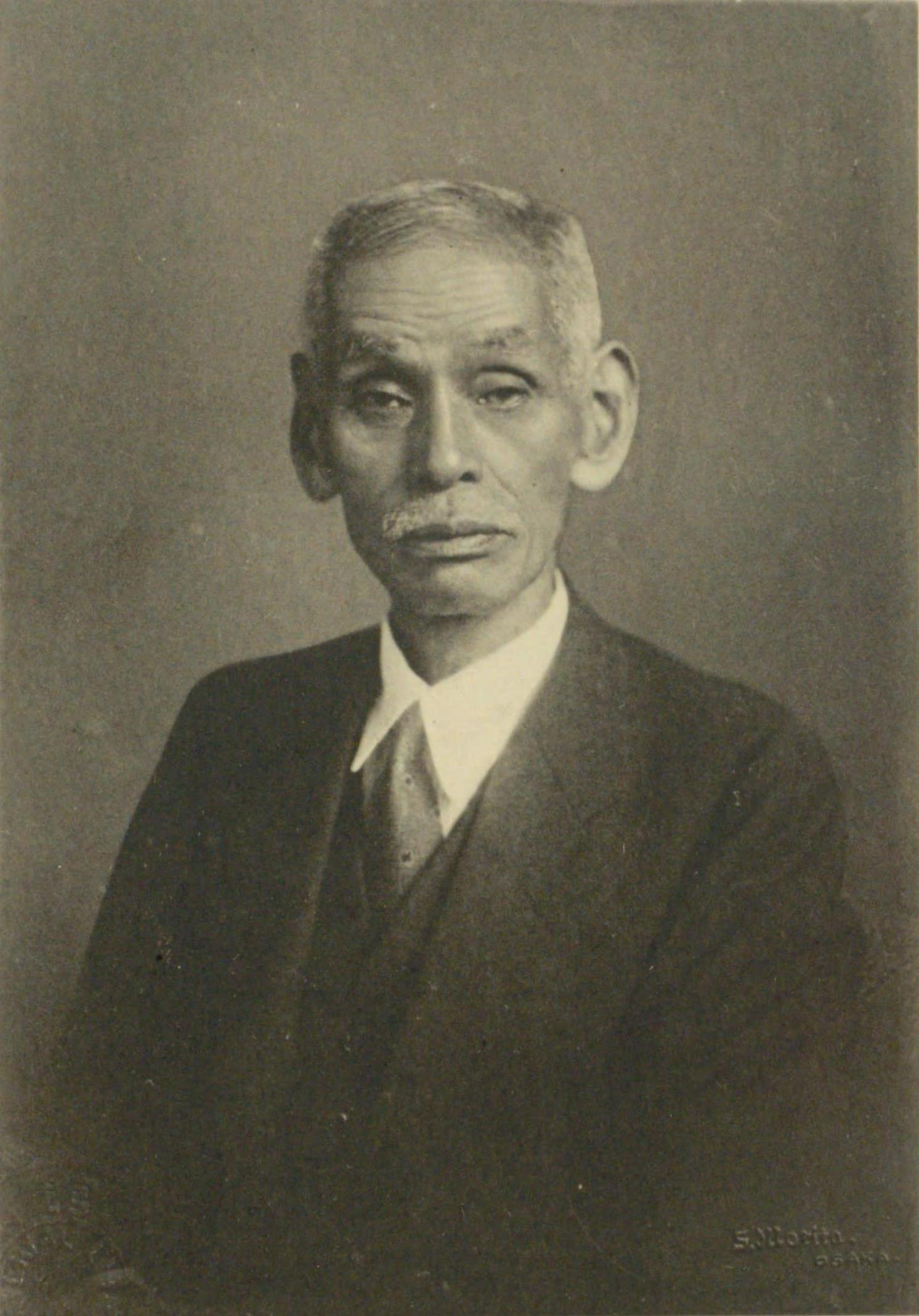
Sadajirō Yamanaka in 1928

Yamanaka Sadajirō (山中定次郎, August 20, 1866 - October 30, 1936) was an Osaka, Japan-based art dealer who arrived in the United States in 1894, opening a small antique shop in Chelsea, New York City, Boston (1899) and London (1900); also an agent in Paris (1905). He subsequently founded Yamanaka & Company, which in 1917 took over a five-story building on Fifth Avenue in Manhattan. Yamanaka operated branch offices in Boston, Chicago, London, Paris, Shanghai and Beijing, and negotiated purchases and provided expertise, while making foundational donations, to Japanese and Chinese collections in major European and American galleries in the early- to mid-20th Century.

After Yamanaka's death, Yamanaka & Company continued to operate under the direction of his heirs, as well as art dealer Harumichi Yatsuhashi (1886–1982), director of its Boston branch, but saw its substantial New York, Chicago, and Boston inventories confiscated and auctioned by the U.S. Government's Office of Alien Property Custodian in 1944. Yamanaka & Company reopened after World War II and continued to operate in a reduced capacity in the 1950s and 1960s.
