= Rāgarāja =

Deity venerated by the Esoteric and Vajrayana Buddhist traditions

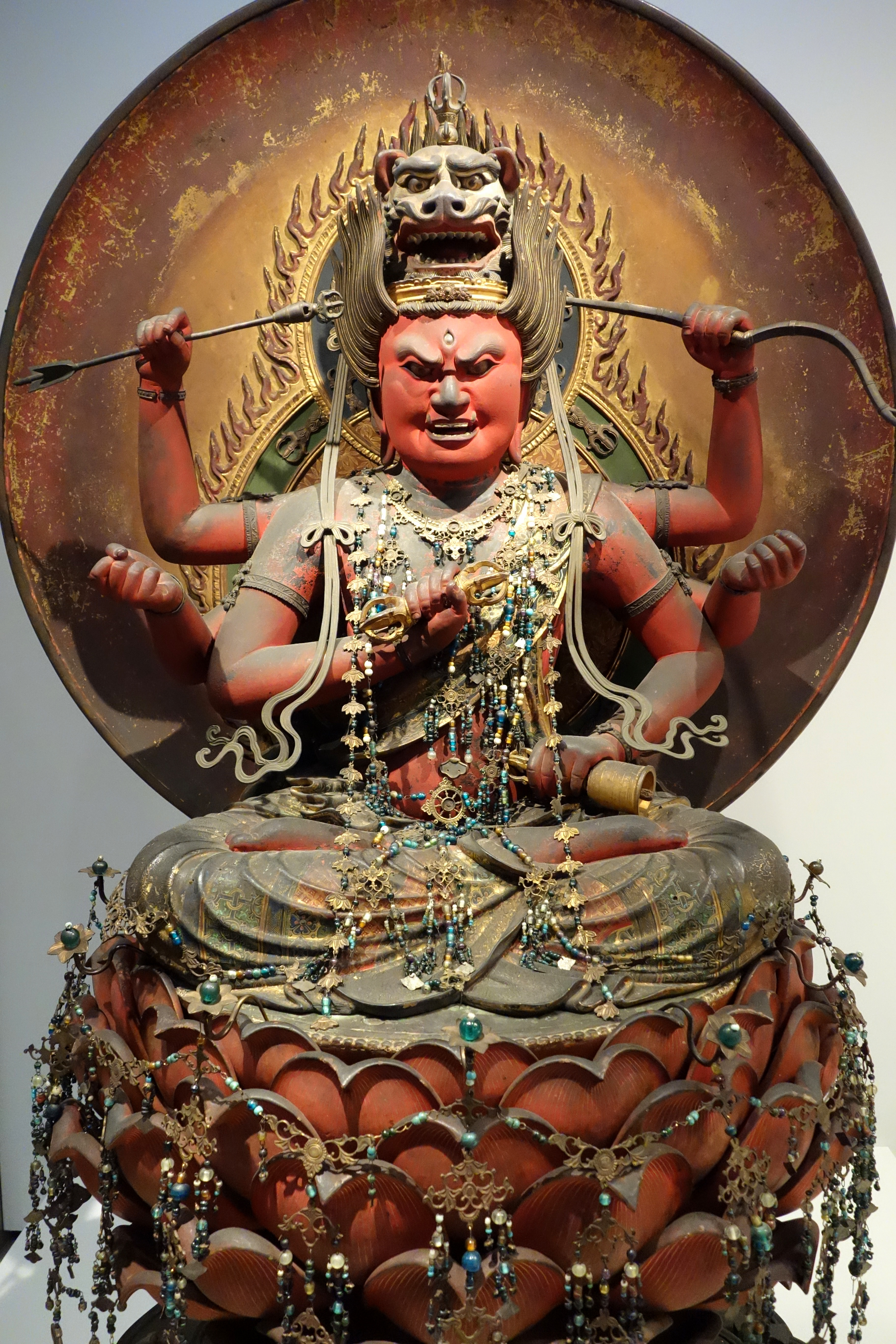
- Seated Aizen Myo'o (Ragaraja), Kamakura period, 13th century, Tokyo National Museum, Japan. Important Cultural Property

Chinese name
- Traditional Chinese: 愛染明王
- Simplified Chinese: 爱染明王
Transcriptions
Standard Mandarin
- Hanyu Pinyin: Àirǎn Míngwáng
- Wade–Giles: Ai^{4}-jan^{3} Ming^{2}-wang^{2}
- IPA: [âɪɻàn mǐŋwǎŋ]

Tibetan name
- Tibetan: འདོད་པའི་རྒྱལ་པོ།

Vietnamese name
- Vietnamese alphabet: Ái Nhiễm Minh Vương

Korean name
- Hangul: 애염명왕
- Hanja: 愛染明王
Transcriptions
- Revised Romanization: Aeyeom Myeongwang

Japanese name
- Kanji: 愛染明王
Transcriptions
- Romanization: Aizen Myō'ō

Sanskrit name
- Sanskrit: Rāgarāja

Rāgarāja (Sanskrit: रागराज) is a deity venerated in the Esoteric and Vajrayana Buddhist traditions. He is especially revered in Chinese Esoteric Buddhism in Chinese communities as well as Shingon and Tendai in Japan.

== Nomenclature ==
Rāgarāja is known to transform sexual desires, especially lust, into pathways to spiritual awakening. When scriptures related to him reached China during the Tang dynasty, his Sanskrit name was translated as Àirǎn Míngwáng "Love-stained Wisdom King". In Japanese, the same Kanji characters are read Aizen Myō'ō.

== Depiction ==
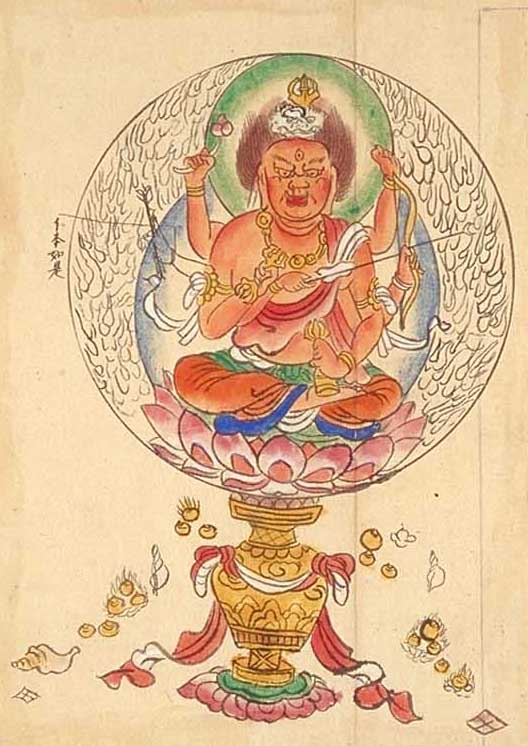
Aizen-Myō'ō (Rāgarāja) described in "Zuzōshō" (図像抄), a Buddhist commentary compiled in 1139 during the Heian period in Japan.

Rāgarāja, also known as Aizen-Myō'ō, is one of many Wisdom kings, (but not in the traditional grouping of the five great Myō'ō, or Godai Myō'ō) Wisdom Kings like Acala (Fudo-Myō'ō). There are four different mandalas associated with Rāgarāja: The first posits him with thirty-seven assistant devas, the second with seventeen. The other two are special arrangements: one made by Enchin, fourth Tendai patriarch; the other is a Shiki mandala which represents deities using their mantra seed syllables drawn in bonji. Rāgarāja is also depicted in statuary and thangka having two heads: Rāgarāja and Acala or Rāgarāja and Guanyin, both iterations symbolizing a commingling of subjugated, complementary energies, typically male/female but also male/male. There are two, four or six armed incarnations of Rāgarāja but the six-armed one is the most common. Those six arms bear a bell which calls one to awareness; a vajra, the diamond that cuts through illusion, an unopened lotus flower representing the power of subjugation, a bow and arrows (sometimes with Rāgarāja shooting the arrow into the heavens), and the last one holding something that we cannot see (referred to by advanced esoteric practitioners as "THAT".) Rāgarāja is most commonly depicted sitting in full lotus position atop an urn that ejects jewels showing beneficence in granting wishes.

He is portrayed as a red-skinned man with a fearsome appearance, a vertical third eye and flaming wild hair that represents rage, lust and passion. Rāgarāja was also popular among Chinese tradesmen who worked in the fabric-dying craft, typically accomplished with sorghum. He is petitioned by devotees for a peaceful home and fortune in business. There is usually a lion's head on top of his head in his hair, representing the mouth into which thoughts and wishes may be fed. Some of these are the wishes of local devotees who make formal requests for success in marriage and sexual relations. According to the Pavilion of Vajra Peak and all its Yogas and Yogins Sutra, or Yogins Sutra (attributed, likely apocryphally, to the great Buddhist patriarch Vajrabodhi), Rāgarāja represents the state at which harnessed sexual excitement or agitation—which are otherwise decried as defilements—are seen as equal to enlightenment, and passionate love can become compassion for all living things.

Rāgarāja is similar to the red form of Tara, called Kurukullā, in Tibetan Buddhism. Appropriately, Rāgarāja's mantras are pronounced in either Chinese or Japanese transliterations of Sanskrit; the cadences depending upon the respective region where his devotees reside and practice, and whether in the Shingon or Tendai schools. His seed vowel, as written in bonji, is pronounced "HUM," usually with a forceful emphasis coming from the use of lower belly muscles. This is part of the syncretic practice of mixing Tantra and Buddhism as was popular during the Heian period courts and amongst the lower classes of both China and Japan. His popularity in Japan reached an apogee when a Shingon priest used magical chants and rituals to call up the Kamikaze that protected the Japanese from sea-born invaders.

== Patronage of homosexuality in Japan ==
At various periods throughout Japanese history, Rāgarāja was invoked as a patron and symbol of homoerotic male desire. While it is ahistorical to ascribe a "gay" self-identification to historical figures, clear examples of Rāgarāja's patronage of men having intimate sexual relations with other men appear in the historical record. Male kabuki actors placed love letters to the men they desired on the wall of Rāgarāja's temple at Naniwa in hopes of attaining success in love. In a story from the Ashikaga era, a man praises his male lover by comparing him to Rāgarāja. Rāgarāja's dharani was also included in the preparatory prayers performed by the young male consorts of Japanese Buddhist monks in some kanjo rituals.

== See also ==
- Seated Rāgarāja (Nara National Museum) - a sculpture from 1256 of Rāgarāja, now at the Nara National Museum, now an Important Cultural Property
