= Eisen =

Eisen /aɪzən/ is a German surname meaning "iron". Notable people with the surname include:

- Arnold Eisen, professor of Jewish studies
- Arthur Arturovich Eisen, a Russian soloist with the Alexandrov Ensemble
- Charles-Dominique-Joseph Eisen (1720–1778), French painter and engraver
- Cliff Eisen, Canadian musicologist
- Erez Eisen, Israeli music producer
- François Eisen. French engraver
- Gary Eisen, American politician
- Gustav Eisen, Swedish-American scientist
- Hilda Eisen, Polish-born American businessperson, philanthropist, and Holocaust survivor
- Jonathan Eisen, American biologist
- Matthias Johann Eisen, Estonian folklorist
- Michael Eisen, American biologist
- Norm Eisen, American lawyer and diplomat
- Percy A. Eisen, American architect
- Rich Eisen, American television journalist
- Sara Eisen, American television journalist
- Stanley Bert "Paul Stanley" Eisen, American musician
- Theodore Eisen, American architect
- Thelma "Tiby" Eisen (1922-2014), American baseball player
- Tripp Eisen, American musician
- Zach Tyler Eisen, American voice actor

Eisen is also a masculine Japanese given name. Notable people with the name include:

- Keisai Eisen (渓斎 英泉; 1790–1848), Japanese ukiyo-e artist
- Okuda Eisen (奥田 穎川; 1753–1811), Japanese potter

== Other ==
- Eisen (7th Sea), a 2000 supplement for the role-playing game 7th Sea

== See also ==
- Aizen (disambiguation)
- Eisenmann
