= 1851 in architecture =

The year 1851 in architecture involved some significant architectural events and new buildings.

== Events ==
- Missions Héliographiques established by Prosper Mérimée to photograph historical French architecture.

== Buildings and structures ==
=== Buildings opened ===
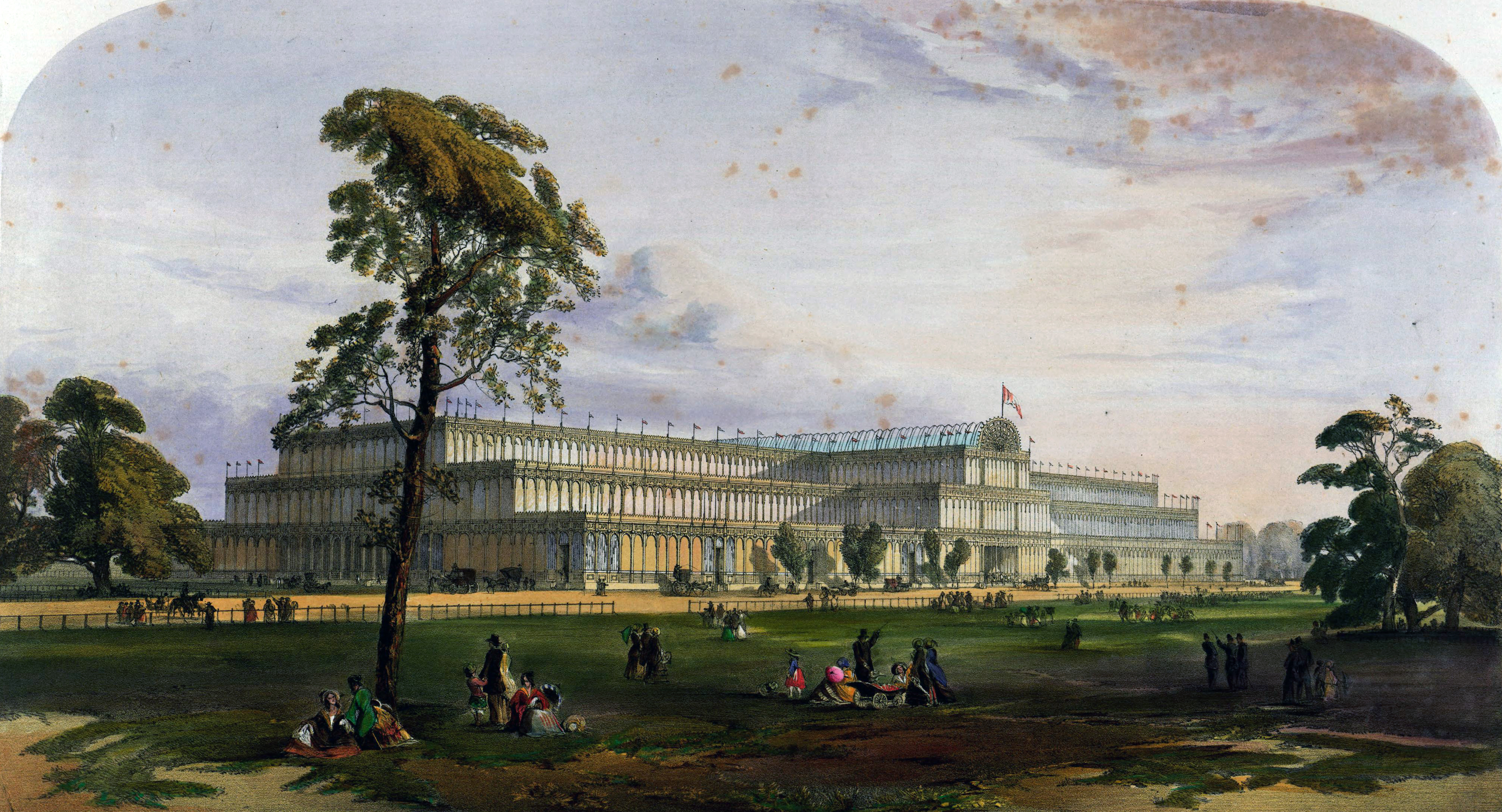
The Crystal Palace

- February 5 – Saint Thomas Episcopal Church and Rectory, Smithfield, Rhode Island, USA, designed by Thomas Alexander Tefft.
- May 1
  - The Crystal Palace, home of the Great Exhibition, erected in Hyde Park, London to the design of Joseph Paxton.
  - Permanent Windsor Riverside railway station in England completed to the design of William Tite.
- May 31 – Madonna dell'Archetto, Rome Italy.
- July 25 – Holy Trinity Church, Bangalore, India.
- October 1 – Alabama State Capitol, Montgomery, Alabama.

=== Buildings completed ===
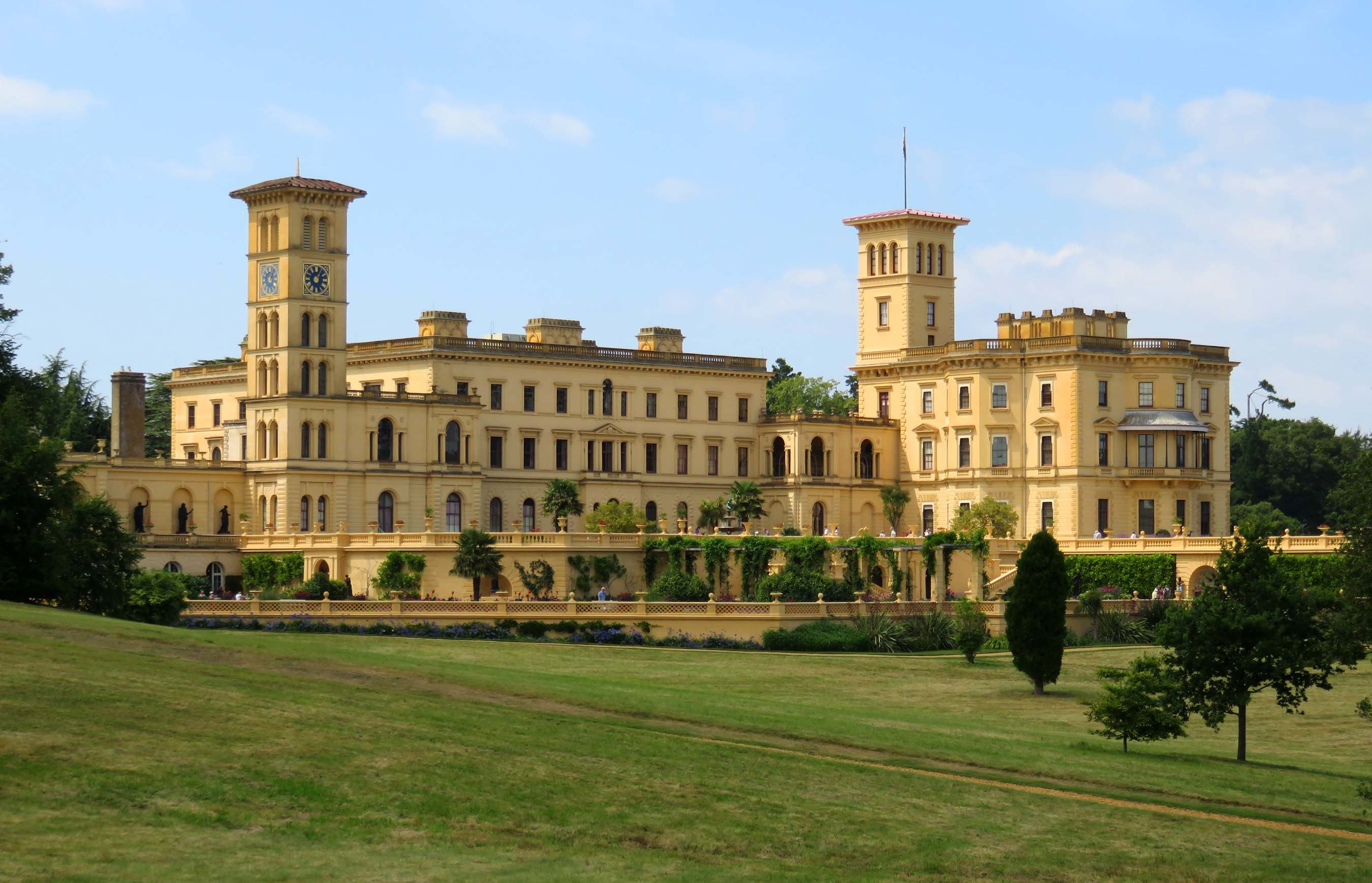
Osborne House on the Isle of Wight, England

- Osborne House on the Isle of Wight, England, designed by Prince Albert in consultation with builder Thomas Cubitt.
- Dock Tower in Grimsby, England.
- Donaldson's Hospital in Edinburgh, Scotland, designed by William Henry Playfair.
- De Wachter, Zuidlaren, Netherlands.
- Wat San Chao Chet, Bangkok, Thailand.
- Stone Bastei Bridge, Saxony.

== Buildings commenced ==
- St. Stephen's Basilica in Budapest, Hungary, designed by Miklós Ybl.
- Muhammad Amin Khan Madrasa in Khiva, Uzbekistan.
- Hurstpierpoint College in England, designed by Richard Cromwell Carpenter.

== Publications ==
- Gottfried Semper – The Four Elements of Architecture, part 1
- Edmund Sharpe – The Seven Periods of English Architecture.

== Awards ==
- RIBA Royal Gold Medal – Thomas Leverton Donaldson.
- Grand Prix de Rome, architecture – Gabriel-Auguste Ancelet.

== Births ==
- March 10 – Heinrich Wenck, Danish architect (died 1936)
- March 26 – John Eisenmann, Cleveland-based US architect (died 1924)
- June 29 – (Edmund) Peter Paul Pugin, English architect, son of Augustus Welby Pugin and half-brother of Edward Welby Pugin (died 1904)

== Deaths ==
- October 13 – Samuel Beazley, British theatre architect and writer (born 1786)
- October 25 – Giorgio Pullicino, Maltese painter and architect (born 1779)
- November 18 – Jacob Ephraim Polzin, German Neoclassical architect (born 1778)
