= Winnipeg Warming Huts; An Art and Architecture Competition on Ice =

Canadian design competition

The Warming Huts: An Art and Architecture Competition on Ice is a design competition that takes place in Winnipeg, Manitoba. The competition features art installations submitted by various artists and architects that are placed along the frozen Red River and Assiniboine River for the community to enjoy. The Warming Huts are the product of a recurring exercise in design and construction that takes place on the frozen rivers of Winnipeg every winter with limitless design variations allowing a lot of freedom for concept exploration.

== History ==
The competition was first established in 2009 by Sputnik Architecture Inc. with the main purpose of attracting the public back to the downtown section of Winnipeg, especially during the cold winter months. The location of the competition was chosen because of its importance to Canadian history. The Forks Historic Site was used mainly during two time periods, 5600 BC - 1000 BC and 500 AD - 2000 AD, as a route to transport and trade goods at its location in the junction of the Red and Assiniboine River. The river was commonly used by many Indigenous peoples, the most common group being Algonquin peoples.

== Competition guidelines ==
The installations should follow the themes of engaging the effects of solar radiation, wind chill, and the snow shifting the landscapes. The three winning designs will be chosen by a blind jury based on their inventive use of materials, ability to provide shelter, poetics of assembly and form, integration with the environment, and simplicity of construction. The design has to be durable or reliable in order to withstand the elements of the Winnipeg winters.

== Past artists and architects ==
The Warming Huts have been designed and built with the participation of significant designers and artists from around the world. These installations include works from Frank Gehry, Anish Kapoor, Étienne Gaboury, and Patkau Architects. Works from the first decade of the Warming Huts are documented in the book "Warming Huts: a decade + of art and architecture on ice".

== Past installations ==
Every year three winners are chosen by the blind jury. Here are the winning installations over the competitions 14 years of running.

2023 -Curtain, Hayspace, Meanwhile We Still Dream

Curtain by Alejandro Felix and Fang Cui represents a frozen waterfall that uses aspects of both the site and ice.

Hayspace by Philipp Gmür and Hugh Taylor Walenstadt is a representation of hay bales often found in the Prairie landscape.

We Still Dream by Lindo Jia and Jaymon Diaz displays searching for shelter through the elements.

2022 - Singing in the Shower, Sunset, Warming Inflation Hands

Singing in the Shower by Luca Roncoroni and Tina Soli is a representation of the carefree feeling of singing in the shower.

Sunset by Democratic Architects is a shelter that's provided for users to watch the sunset, protected from the winds.

Warming Inflation Hands by artist Popper Zhu mimics the shape we as humans make with our hands when we are protecting something.

2021 - Yohaus, Divergence, Hot Landing

Yohaus by Karina Leong & Jeremy Chan encourages social distancing in the form of play by allowing visitors to mold their own snow huts.

Divergence by Thomas Cheney is a sudden interruption in the original skating path taking the visitors on a path of sudden twists and turns.

Hot Landing by AtLRG Architecture Inc. is a replication of a crashed NASA Apollo Command Capsule vessel which uses solar heating to act as a sauna.

2020 - The Droombok, Forest Village, S(hovel)

The Droombok by Noël Picaper is a representation of the changing environments casting a variety of changing shadows and wind patterns.

Forest Village by Ashida Architect & Associates Co. is a series of huts that allow people to reconnect to nature and each other.

S(hovel) by Modern Office + Sumer Singh is a small shelter that takes an ordinary winter object and reimagines it as a place to inhabit, and all 194 shovels are donated afterwards.

2019 - Hoverbox, Huttie, Weathermen

Hoverbox by Simon Kassner and Wilko Hoffmann is a play using both distance and proximity as it leads visitors through a dark maze that appears to hover over the ice.

Huttie by Jennie O’Keefe + Chris Pancoe is inspired by the children's television series H.R. Pufnstuf which can be used as a shelter, your friend during bad weather.

Weathermen by Haemee Han + Jaeyual Lee is an installation that replicates a snowman, being hollowed out in the middle, the snowmen become inhabitable.

2018 - Golden Bison, Totem, Trunk

Golden Bison by David Alberto Arroyo Tafolla takes the form of a bison which is Manitoba's national animal, and has yellow colouring which represents the popular Golden Boy statue in Winnipeg.

Totem by Architecture Office b210 is two towers that represent a point of recognition allowing visitors to climb single file up to four meters.

Trunk by Camille Bianchi and Ryder Thalheimer takes the form of a tree that can become inhabitable and is inspired by the quietness of growth in the world.

2017 - Greetings From Bubble Beach, Ice Lantern, Open Border

Greetings From Bubble Beach by Team 888 is an interactive snow globe that gives its visitors the opportunity to escape from the cold.

Ice Lantern by Lisa Tondino, Alexandra Bolen, Mathew Rodrigues, and Drew Klassen is based loosely on a primitive hut that attracts skaters using the glow of light, to shelter beneath.

Open Border by Joyce de Grauw and Paul van den Berg creates a narrow gateway where skaters can go to warm up, mostly being warmed by the red glow the sun creates on the installation.

2016 - Temple, Ice Maze, Shelterbelt

Temple by Kirill Bair and Daria Lisitsyna mimics the ancient Greek places of worship but is constructed out of steel fuel drums and recycled material, meaning it's a place of worship connected to the wind.

Ice Maze by Andreas Mede is an interactive installation that encourages problem solving in a variety of spaces, relying on the sky and the surrounding elements.

Shelterbelt by Robert B Trempe Jr acts as a windbreaker that is primarily constructed using steel rebar. The rebar hides the interior environment and also produces a constant sound of rustling as they sway in the wind.

2015 - Recycling Words, The Hole Idea, This Big

Recycling Words, by KANVA, is an interactive installation that combines recycled chairs and skis to enable skaters to glide across the ice.

The Hole Idea, by Weisse Architecture and Urbanism Limited, is a portable hole that is embedded into the snowy landscape which provides shelter to the skaters from the harsh winds.

This Big, by Tina Soli and Luca Roncoroni, is a representation of the popular sport of ice fishing and catching a fish so big it doesn't fit through the hole.

2014 - NUZZLES, Red Blanket, Windshield

NUZZLES, by RAW DESIGN INC. is a warming hut that takes the properties of fur to provide heat in a fun and colourful way.

Red Blanket, by Workshop Architecture Inc, is meant to be eye-catching against the white winter landscape as well as protect skaters against prevailing winds.

Windshield, by Kate Busby and Bella Totino, is a five meter tall wind vane that is constantly protecting skaters from prevailing winds due to its ability to rotate.

2013 - Hygge House, Smokehouse, Woolhaus

Hygge House, designed by three separate Winnipeg firms, is a recreation of a classic Canadian winter symbol, the cottage.

Smokehouse, by aamodt/plumb architects in Cambridge, Massachusetts, is a warming hut of charred wood and ivory felt representing animal pelts that were used for warmth.

Woolhaus, by Myungkweon Parkis, a sensory experience that uses felt to absorb heat, light, and sound creating an isolated interior environment.

2012 - WIND CATCHER, Ice Pillows, ROPE Pavillion

WIND CATCHER, by Tina Soli and Luca Roncoroni, is a "hole in the wall" that encourages interaction, as well as acts as a wind tunnel.

Ice Pillows, by Mjölk is an installation that utilizes the surrounding environment and provides shelter by extending from the river trail.

ROPE Pavillion, by New York's Kevin Erickson and Allison Warren, uses simple materials to create a shelter that nestles itself into the river trail.

2011 - WOODPILE, by Ha(y)ven, Under the Covers

WOODPILE, by Talmon Biran, is an interactive installation that transforms from a completely enclosed space in the winter, to an open space in the Spring due its log walls.

Ha(y)ven, is designed by a team of New York architects, is a structure made out of a simple material, hay, that is heavily relied on in the winter.

Under the Covers, is designed by a team of Philadelphia architects, it resembles the blanket of snow being lifted up to reveal the underside, creating a warm refuge for skaters.

== Related events ==
The Warming Hut competition has taken place every January for 14 years now. Since the first competition in 2009, the Warming Huts have inspired similar events in Canada including Toronto's Winter Stations in Toronto, Ontario and Ice Stations in Sudbury, Ontario. This competition drives northern art and design by using the installations as a public event along the Red and Assiniboine River.
