= Yoshiko Kakudo =

American curator

- Born: June 15, 1934; Osaka, Japan
- Died: January 12, 2016 (aged 81); California, U.S.
- Occupations: Curator, philanthropist
- Known for: First curator of Japanese art at the Asian Art Museum, San Francisco

Yoshiko Kakudo (June 15, 1934 – January 12, 2016) was a Japanese-American curator and philanthropist. She was the first curator of Japanese art at the Asian Art Museum in San Francisco.

== Early life and education ==
Kakudo was born in Osaka. She graduated from Kobe College in 1957, with a degree in sociology. She earned a master's degree in decorative art from the University of California, Berkeley in 1964, for her studies in Japanese ceramic arts.

== Career ==
Kakudo started at the Asian Art Museum as a research assistant in the Avery Brundage Collection. She became the museum's first curator of Japanese art in 1970, and planned for the Japan Center gallery during its construction. She was also curator of the museum's Korean art collection until 1989. She curated more than thirty exhibitions, gave lectures, organized conferences, and wrote articles. She retired from the museum in 1994.

Kakudo was also a translator, artist, and philanthropist. She had her family's tea house shipped from Osaka to donate it to the Hakone Gardens in California. She was inducted into the Bunka Hall of Fame in 2012. In 2009, she established the Glenn Glasow Graduate Fellowship at the California State University, East Bay, in memory of her partner, and supported the Father Michael Monchau Scholarship in Homiletics at Graduate Theological Union. She donated photographs by William Abbenseth to the San Francisco Museum of Modern Art.

== Publications ==
- "An Unusual Square Ao-Oribe Dish in the Avery Brundage Collection" (1968)
- "The Tartar Screens and Kanō Sōshū" (1971)
- "A Stem Bowl by Okuda Eisen" (1972)
- Art of Japan: Masterworks in the Asian Art Museum (1991, catalog)
- Toru Takemitsu, Confronting Silence: Selected Writings (1994, translator, with Glenn Glasow)
- Shozo Kajima, Evening Clearing (1994, poetry, translator, with Glenn Glasow)

== Personal life ==
Kakudo's longtime partner was music professor Glenn Glasow; he died in 2002, and she died in 2016, at the age of 81, after a stroke. Her estate funded the Yoshiko Kakudo Donor Advised Fund of the San Francisco Foundation; the Asian Art Museum has a Yoshiko Kakudo Memorial Acquisition Fund named in her memory.
