= Reynolds-Seaquist House =

- U.S. National Register of Historic Places
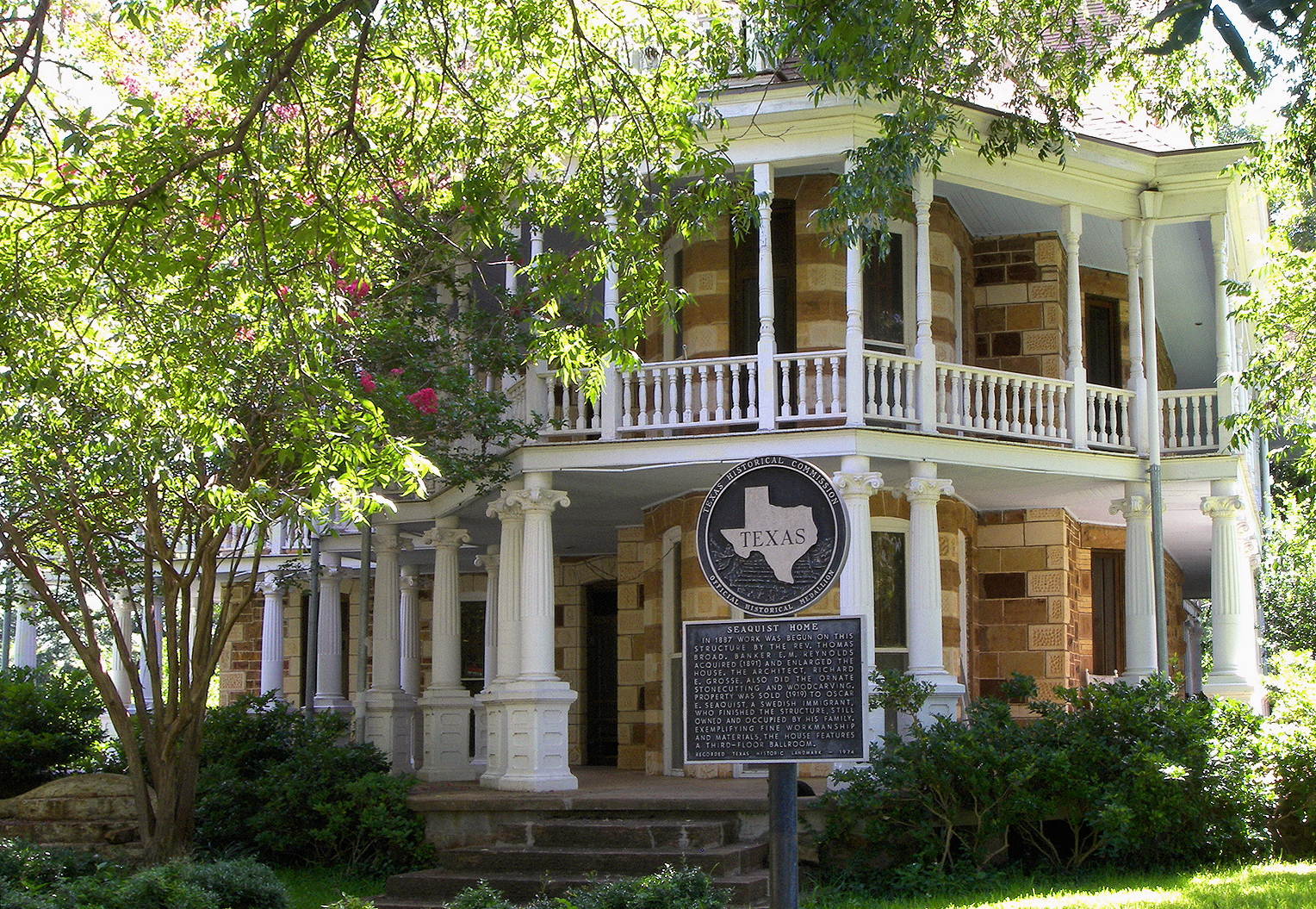
- The Reynolds-Seaquist House in Mason, Texas

- Location within Texas Location within the United States
- Location: 400 Broad Street, Mason, Texas
- Coordinates: 30°45′05″N 99°13′54″W
- Area: less than one acre
- Built by: Richard Grosse etal
- NRHP reference No.: 74002087
- Added to NRHP: November 20, 1974

Often referred to as a two-story house, the National Register of Historic Places refers to it as a three-storied house, plus basement: The first floor is the living room area. On the second floor are the individual bedrooms. The third floor is designed as a recreation area.

In 1887, Methodist minister Rev. Thomas A, Broad built this house on the site of his previous first home at Mason, Texas. The house later changed hands twice, finally being purchased in 1891 by Citizens National Bank business partner Edward M. Reynolds of New York. Reynolds subsequently recruited Dresden School of Architecture alumni Richard E. Gross to enlarge the house. By 1898, the bank was no longer in need of the services of Reynolds. Although he relocated elsewhere, his family remained in Mason.

Swedish immigrant Oscar Seaquist bought the house in 1919. Upon his 1933 death, his widow Ada maintained the mansion until her 1972 death. The Seaquist House Foundation has been in charge of oversight since January 2015 .

The house was added to the National Register of Historic Places on November 20, 1974. It is also a Recorded Texas Historic Landmark.
