= The Four Elements of Architecture =

Non-fiction work by Gottfried Semper

- English language edition cover
- Author: Gottfried Semper
- Original title: Die vier Elemente der Baukunst
- Translator: Harry F. Mallgrave; Wolfgang Herrmann
- Language: German
- Subject: Architecture
- Genre: Non-fiction
- Publication date: 1851
- Publication place: Germany
- English publication date: 1989
- Media type: Print
- ISBN: 9780521180863

The Four Elements of Architecture is a book by the German architect Gottfried Semper. Published in 1851, it is an attempt to explain the origins of architecture through the lens of anthropology. The book divides architecture into four distinct elements: the hearth, the roof, the enclosure and the mound. The origins of each element can be found in the traditional crafts of ancient "barbarians":

- hearth – metallurgy, ceramics
- roof – carpentry
- enclosure – textile, weaving
- mound – earthwork

Semper, stating that the hearth was the first element created:

The first sign of settlement and rest after the hunt, the battle, and wandering in the desert is today, as when the first men lost paradise, the setting up of the fireplace and the lighting of the reviving, warming, and food preparing flame. Around the hearth the first groups formed: around the hearth the first groups assembled; around it the first alliances formed; around it the first rude religious concepts were put into the customs of a cult... Throughout all phases of society the hearth formed that sacred focus around which took order and shape. It is the first and most important element of architecture. Around it were grouped the other three elements: the roof, the enclosure, and the mound. The protecting negations or defenders of the hearths flame against three hostile elements of nature.

Enclosures (walls) were said to have their origins in weaving. Just as fences and pens were woven sticks, the most basic form of a spatial divider still seen in use in parts of the world today is the fabric screen. Only when additional functional requirements are placed on the enclosure (such as structural weight-bearing needs) does the materiality of the wall change to something beyond fabric.

The mat and its use in primitive huts interchangeably as floors, walls, and draped over frames was considered by Gottfried Semper to be the origins of architecture.

The book was an attempt at a universal theory of architecture. The book was not the classification of a specific typology but rather was more universal in its attempt to offer a more general theory of architecture. Rather than describing one building typology as being the beginning, he considers what assemblies and systems are universal in all indigenous primitive structures.”

The Four Elements of Architecture as an archaeologically driven theory stressed functionalism as a prerequisite to intentionality.

Semper's distinct interpretation of the primitive hut, as presented in The Four Elements of Architecture, remains influential in contemporary architectural theory and is further elaborated in his subsequent work, Der Stil in den technischen und tektonischen Künsten.
