= Eisenmann =

Eisenmann (also transliterated Eisenman or Eiseman) is a German- or Yiddish-language surname from the German Eisen. The name refers to one who works with iron. Notable people with the surname include:

- Alvin Eisenman (1921–2013), American graphic designer
- Charles Eisenmann (1850–1927), German/American photographer
- Chuck Eisenmann (1918–2010), American baseball player and dog trainer
- Doug Eisenman (born 1968), American tennis player
- Eugene Eisenmann (1906–1981), Panamanian/American lawyer and ornithologist
- Florence Eiseman (1899–1988), American children's clothing designer
- I. Roberto Eisenmann Jr., a Panamanian journalist and founder and head of La Prensa, Panama's newspaper of record
- Ike Eisenmann (born 1962), American actor, voice actor and producer
- John Eiseman (1925–2016), American sprint canoer
- Leatrice Eiseman (fl. 1998–), American colour specialist
- Louis Eisenmann (1869–1937), a French historian and professor of Slavic studies
- Nicole Eisenman (born 1965), American visual artist
- Otto Eisenmann (1913–2002), German politician
- Peter Eisenman (born 1932), American architect
- Robert Eisenman (born 1937), Professor of Middle East Religions and Archaeology
- Susanne Eisenmann (born 1964), German politician
- Thomas Eisenmann, Professor of Business Administration at Harvard Business School
- Will Eisenmann (1906–1992), a German/Swiss composer

== See also ==
- Eisenmann Medal, ornithological award
- Eisenmann Synagogue, Antwerp, Belgium
- Eisenmannia, synonym of Blainvillea
- Eizen, surname and given name
