= Villa Rosa (Dresden) =

Coordinates: 51.061641°N 13.759904°E

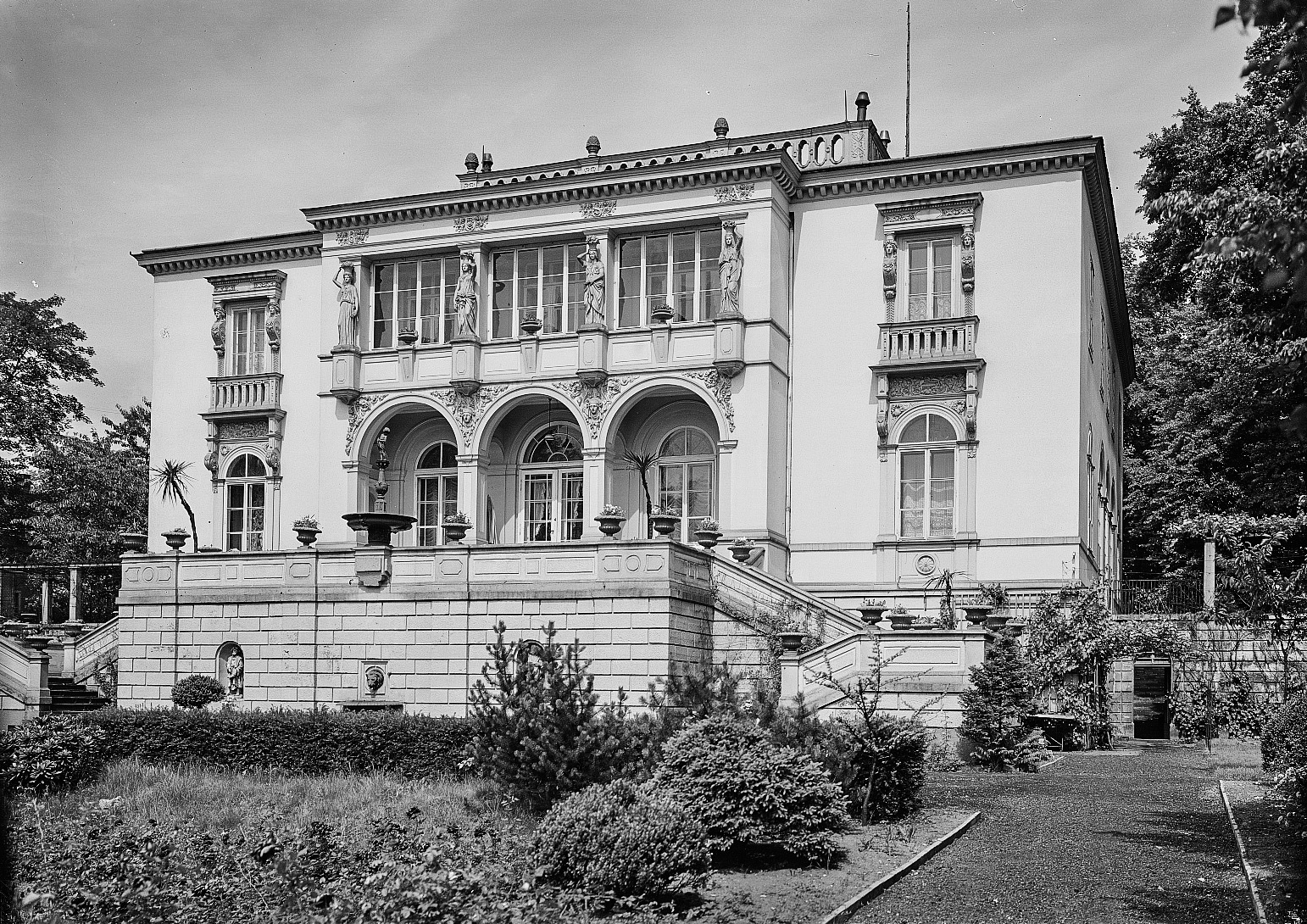

General information
- Status: Destroyed
- Type: Villa
- Location: Dresden, German
- Destroyed: 1945

The Villa Rosa (1839–1945) was a former historical villa in Dresden, built in 1839 and destroyed in 1945. It was considered one of the most important villa buildings in Dresden, due to its architecture.

== History ==
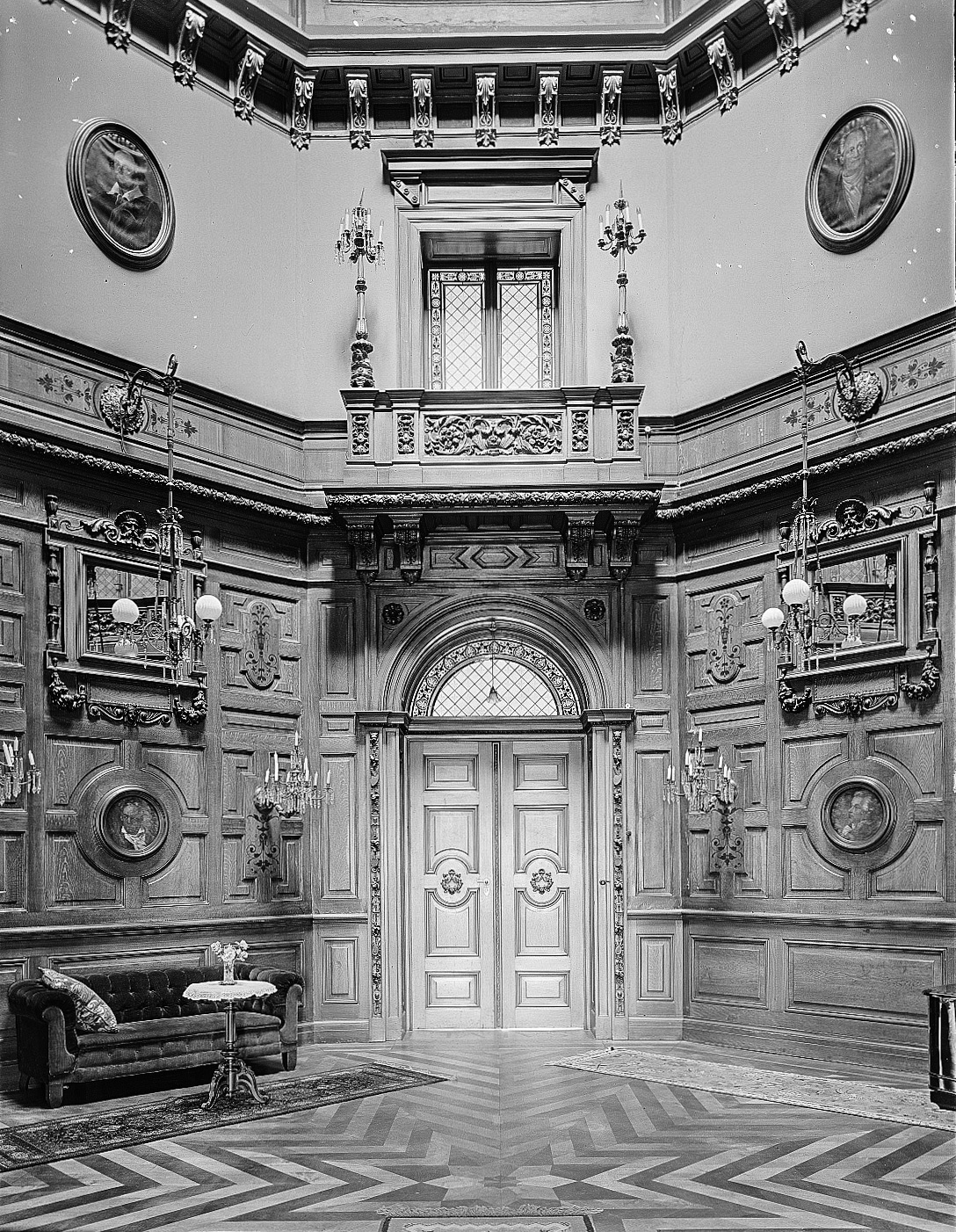
Villa Rosa, interior view of the octagonal drawing room (hall), c. 1839

It was built in 1839 by Gottfried Semper for the banker Martin Wilhelm Oppenheim (1781–1863) and was a model for villa construction in Dresden for many decades. It was built as a summer residence for Oppenheim and his family. The villa design was modeled on the Italian Renaissance villa, La Rotonda by architect Andrea Palladio in Vicenza, Italy. The name of the villa was in honor of Oppenheim's wife "Rosa", née Alexander (1792–1849).

Martin Oppenheim died from a stroke at Villa Rosa on October 10, 1863, at the age of 83.

The villa burned down during the air raids on Dresden in World War II and was demolished in 1955. Today there is a primary school on the site. A bust of the architect Semper is in front of the school and a plaque on the Elbe river side of the garden are reminiscent of the villa.

The property was given a new house number several times: According to the respective address books, it was Holzhofgasse 15 from 1840 to 1875, from 1876 to 1892 its address was Holzhofgasse 20, then until 1932 Holzhofgasse 4. Most recently, Villa Rosa had the address Löwenstraße 2a, last owner was the city of Dresden.

Other buildings by architect Semper for Oppenheim included the Palais Kaskel-Oppenheim.
