= The Primitive Hut =

Primitive Hut

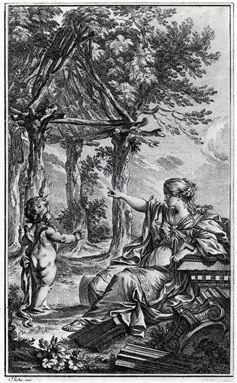
Frontispiece of Marc-Antoine Laugier: Essai sur l'architecture 2nd ed. 1755 by Charles Eisen (1720–1778). Allegorical engraving of the Vitruvian primitive hut.

The Primitive Hut is a concept that explores the origins of architecture and its practice. The concept explores the anthropological relationship between human and the natural environment as the fundamental basis for the creation of architecture. The idea of The Primitive Hut contends that the ideal architectural form embodies what is natural and intrinsic.

The Primitive Hut as an architectural theory was brought to life over the mid-1700s till the mid-1800s, theorised in particular by abbé Marc-Antoine Laugier. Laugier provided an allegory of a man in nature and his need for shelter in An Essay on Architecture that formed an underlying structure and approach to architecture and its practice. This approach has been explored in architectural theory to speculate on a possible destination for architecture as a discipline.

== Origins of The Primitive Hut: Essai sur l'architecture (Essay on Architecture), 1755 ==
The Essay on Architecture was first published by Marc-Antoine Laugier in 1753. It was written in the Age of Enlightenment, during a time characterised by rationalist thinking through science and reason. Architecture in France during this period was defined predominantly by the Baroque style with its excessive ornamentation and religious iconography. Rather than being concerned with the search for meaning and the over analysis of the representational elements of architecture, Laugier's essay proposed that the idea of noble and formal architecture was found in what was necessary for architecture, not in its ornamentation but in its true underlying fundamentals. Laugier argued for the simplicity of architecture, that architecture must return to its origins, the simple rustic hut.

It was through The Primitive Hut that Laugier sought to explain his philosophy of architecture. The Essay on Architecture provides what Laugier explains as the general rules of architecture: the "true principles", the "invariable rules" for "directing the judgement and forming the taste of the gentleman and the architect". To Laugier, The Primitive Hut was the highest virtue that architecture should achieve.

=== The frontispiece illustration ===
An illustration of the primitive hut by Charles Dominique Eisen was the frontispiece for the second edition of Laugier's Essay on Architecture (1755). The frontispiece was arguably one of the most famous images in the history of architecture; it helped to make the essay more accessible and consequently it was more widely received by the public. The message the illustration was suggesting was clear: that the essay would suggest a new direction or a new order for architecture. In the image a young woman who personifies architecture draws the attention of an angelic child towards the primitive hut. Architecture is pointing to a new structural clarity found in nature, rather than the ironic ruins of the past.

=== Premise ===
The Essay on Architecture provides a story of man in his primitive state to explain how the creation of the "primitive man's" house is created instinctively based on man's need to shelter himself from nature. Laugier believed that the model of the primitive man's hut provided the ideal principles for architecture or any structure. It was from this perspective that Laugier formed his general principles of architecture where he outlined the standard form of architecture and what he believed was fundamental to all architecture. To Laugier, the general principles of architecture were found in what was natural, intrinsic and part of natural processes.

=== Outline ===
Laugier's Essay on Architecture is divided into six chapters that focus on the different constituencies and considerations of architecture. It methodically identifies the key components of a building, describes their fundamental importance and how they should be approached.

In Chapter 1: "The General Principles of Architecture", Laugier divides and analyses buildings into five main "articles": the column, entablature, pediment, the different storeys of architecture, the windows and doors. In Article 1, for example, Laugier makes four general rules for the construction of columns, one of them being that the column "must be strictly perpendicular, because being intended to support the whole load, perfect verticality gives it its greatest strength." To Laugier, these articles emphasised the fundamental components of a building and what he identifies as their core necessities - that is, The Primitive Hut model. Laugier emphasised the point that nature provides the rules for architecture.

Laugier used the frontispiece to illustrate that typically architecture needs only three main elements, the free-standing columns, horizontal beams (entablature), and a simple pediment (the triangular end of a pitched roof).

Laugier also noted that the deviation or misuse of the principles lead to inherent faults in typical buildings and in architectural practice. In particular he recognised logical faults, issues such as proportion and unintelligent design. Instead, advocating that "by approaching the simplicity of the model, fundamental mistakes are avoided and true perfection achieved".

The idea also claims that Ancient Greek temples owed their form to the earliest habitations erected by man. In the primitive hut, the horizontal beam was supported by tree trunks planted upright in the ground and the roof was sloped to shed rainwater. This was an extension of the primitive hut concept and the inspiration behind the basic Doric order.

The essay advocates that architecture approach perfection through the search for absolute beauty, specifically by returning to the hypothetical original hut as a model for building.

== Contribution to architectural theory ==
The Primitive Hut made an important contribution to the theory of architecture. It marked the beginning of a significant analysis and debate within architectural theory, particularly between rationalist and utilitarian schools of thought. While previously the field of architecture concerned the search for the ideal building form through truth in building, the primitive hut questioned the universal in architecture. The Laugier Essay questioned the fundamental and the universal requirements of architecture, in that the text marked a new field of inquiry into the field of architecture that changed the understandings and the approach to architecture. In particular, there were the beginnings of an attempt to understand the various individual components of architecture.

Unlike Laugier, Gottfried Semper goes back to this point in his book The Four Elements of Architecture when explaining the origin of building, arguing that it was a matter of human beings gathering around a fire. This narrative, itself symbolic, elucidates what fire could have meant and where it came from. The important thing to take away from it is that men gathered around an event, most likely in a circle. A space formed by human beings thus came into being in two senses: as room between men and as the social space of a group.

The Primitive Hut is an a-historical point of reference that is not necessarily a historical object that is investigated through speculation or an archaeological investigation. The Primitive Hut was instead a self-evident realisation that created a new perspective of architectural inquiry. Architectural inquiry would be engaged to justify the validity of the primitive hut model.

The origins of The Primitive Hut have conceptually been linked to the Old Testament and the story of Adam and Eve, and of other primitive cultures. The classical orders in the stories about primitive dwellings are often the subject of analysis to trace the history of the primitive hut, these have arguably been traced back to the works of Vitruvius and The Ten Books on Architecture. These tracings work to validate The Primitive Hut model.

Scientific and philosophical approaches have led to various branches of inquiry that question both the origins and the possible destinations of architecture. These have been recognised across a range of different cultures. These different approaches have led to various conceptualisations that question cultural differences and attempt to define the ideal principles of architecture and of the primitive hut specifically.

The Primitive hut is a conceptual hut, that is not necessarily a material and physical hut. It is an abstract concept of a place that is created through mans response to the natural environment, where architecture acts as the mediator between man and nature. The Primitive hut concept explores how architecture came to be, and is a way of explaining the fundamental origins of architecture. The Primitive hut provides a point of reference for all speculation on the essentials of building and represents arguably the first architectural 'idea'.

The Primitive Hut concept also suggests that the natural environment provides the solutions for this ideal architectural form. Understandings of vernacular architecture have often had a major influence on the understandings of the Primitive Hut, as they often provide a different point of origin for a potential direction for architecture. Rather than focusing on the meanings that are associated with the building and its components, the Primitive Hut questions the fundamental components that are universal in architecture.

=== Themes ===
Theory surrounding The Primitive Hut covers a number of key themes:

- To present rites where a "primitive hut" has either been built ritually and at seasonal intervals, or deliberately in a "primitive" state for analogous ritual purposes.
- To show how the idea of the primitive hut became a vehicle for architectural theories from the fifteenth century on.
- To suggest that the "primitive hut will retain its validity as a reminder of the original and therefore essential meaning of all building for people: that is, of architecture"

== Types of primitive huts ==
The primitive hut has been theorised to have different forms:

1. The purely historical object that has been abandoned to construct better huts.
2. The hut reconstructed in people's imagination.
3. The anthropological hut, an existing hut that is analysed to rediscover the universal elements of architecture.
4. The primitive hut as a place that continuously reoccurs whenever a building is created both consciously and unconsciously.

== Notable architects and theorists ==
The Primitive Hut concept has been explored over various periods of time to varying extents in architectural history, including by notable architects such as:

- Karl Botticher
- Felix Duban
- Walter Gropius
- Henry Labrouste
- Marc-Antoine Laugier
- Le Corbusier
- Carlo Lodoli
- Adolf Loos
- Francesco Milizia
- Giovanni Battista Piranesi
- Augustus Pugin
- Quatremere de Quincy
- Alois Riegl
- John Ruskin
- Joseph Rykwert
- Gottfried Semper
- Leon Vaudoyer
- Viollet-le-Duc
- Vitruvius
- Frank Lloyd Wright

== See also ==
- Architectural theory
