= Charles-Dominique-Joseph Eisen =

French painter and engraver

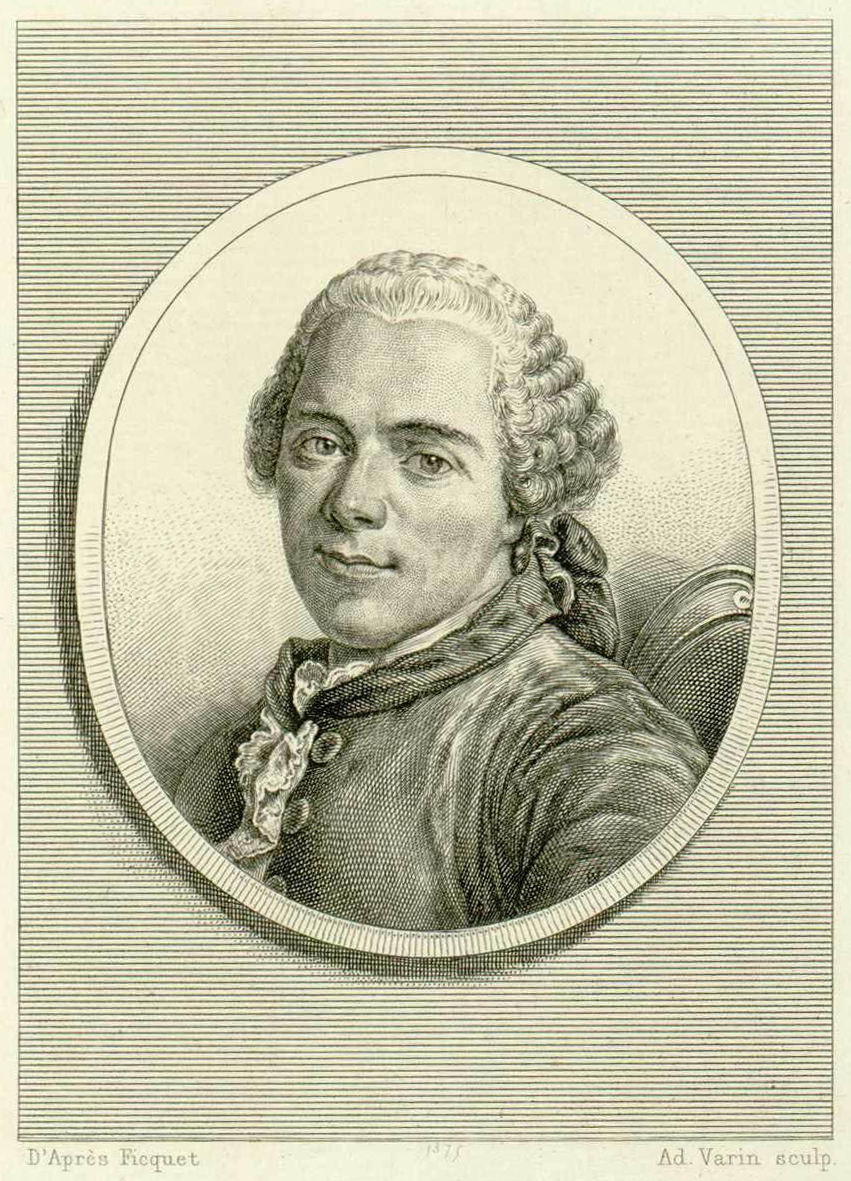
- Portrait engraved by Adolphe Varin after Étienne Ficquet, 1875
- Born: 17 August 1720; Valenciennes, France
- Died: 4 January 1778 (aged 57); Brussels, Brabant, Austrian Netherlands
- Parent: Francois Eisen

Charles-Dominique-Joseph Eisen (17 August 1720 – 4 January 1778) was a French painter and engraver.

== Life ==
The son and pupil of Frans Eisen, he was born at Valenciennes. In 1741, he went to Paris, and in the following year entered the studio of Le Bas. His talent and his sparkling wit gained him admission to the court, where he became painter and draftsman to the King, and drawing-master to Madame de Pompadour. He afterwards fell into disgrace, and in 1777 retired to Brussels, where he died in poverty in 1778.

His paintings are not without merit, but it is as a designer of illustrations and vignettes for books that he is best known. The most notable of these are the designs for the Fermiers généraux edition of the Contes of La Fontaine, published at Amsterdam in 1762; Ovid's Metamorphoses, 1767–71; the Henriade of Voltaire, 1770; the Baisers of Dorat, 1770; and the Vies des Peintres hollandais et flamands of Descamps, published in 1751–63. He etched a few plates of the Virgin, a St. Jerome, St. Ely preaching, etc. There are pictures by him in the Museums of Bordeaux, Alençon, and Bourg, and even at Nordnorsk Kunstmuseum in Tromsø, Norway.

== Gallery ==
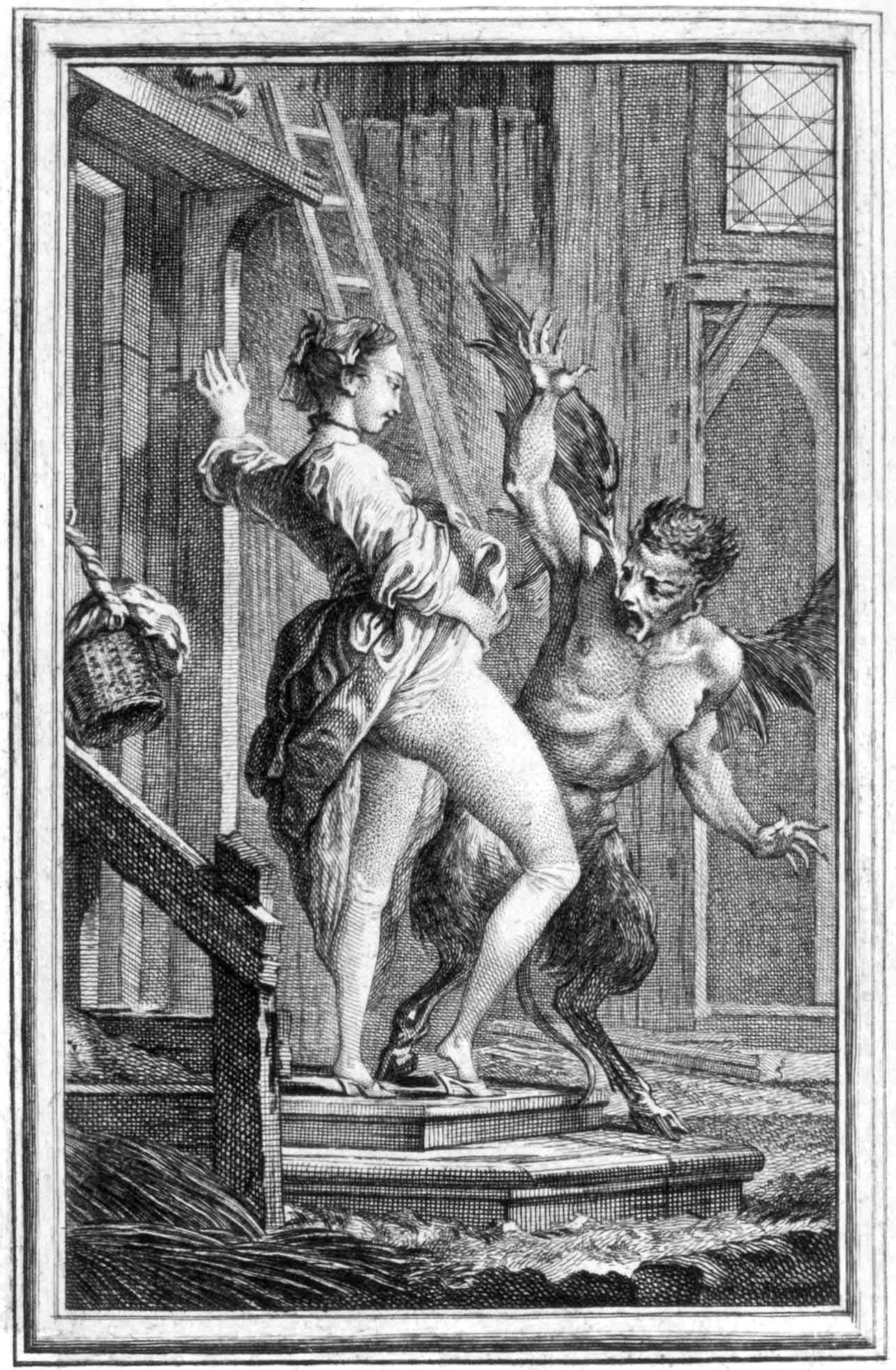
Illustration of "The Devil of Pope-Fig Island", from the Fables of Fontaine

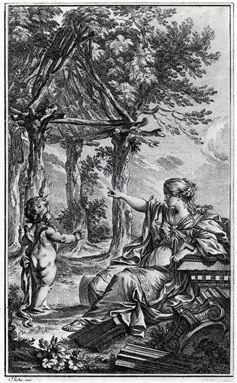
Frontispiece of Essai sur l'Architecture by Marc-Antoine Laugier from 1755, showing and allegorical image of the Vitruvian primitive hut
