= Aizen =

Aizen may refer to:

- Aizen Myō-ō (愛染明王), a Japanese Buddhist deity
- Sousuke Aizen (藍染 惣右介), a main antagonist of the manga series Bleach

== See also ==
- Eizen
