= Marc-Antoine Laugier =

French architectural historian (1713–1769)

- Born: January 22, 1713; Manosque, Provence, France
- Died: 5 April 1769 (aged 55–56)

Philosophical work
- Main interests: History, Architecture
- Notable works: Essay on Architecture

Marc-Antoine Laugier (Manosque, Provence, January 22, 1713 – Paris, April 5, 1769) was a Jesuit priest until 1755, then a Benedictine monk. Overlooking Claude Perrault and numerous other figures, Summerson notes,

Marc Antoine Laugier can perhaps be called the first modern architectural philosopher.

— John Summerson

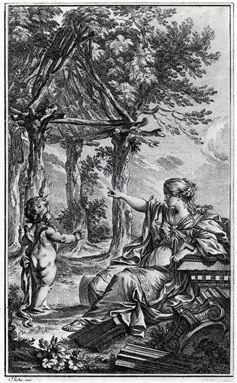
Essai sur l'architecture, frontispiece by Charles-Dominique-Joseph Eisen

== Early life and education ==
Marc-Antoine Laugier was born in Manosque, Provence on January 22, 1713 to Joseph, a bourgeois, and Hortense, a descendant of the noble d'Audifred family. His name was that of his godfather, who was 'noble Marc de Gassaud sieur de Beaurepère.' He entered the priesthood since he was a younger son in a large family. He joined the Noviciate of the Jesuits at Avignon at sixteen years of age, but records indicate that he was actually fourteen.

He received the best education in Europe which included colleges in Lyons, Besançon, Marseilles, and Avignon. He received education in foreign languages like Latin and Greek. He was also a student learning History, Geography, Philosophy, Arithmetic, Geometry, Optics, Astronomy, and civil and military Architecture.

== Career in Paris ==
In 1744, Laugier moved to maison professe in Rue St. Antoine in Paris after saying his final vows. Easter of 1748 in St. Sulpice is the first recorded sermon of Laugier. He had a recognized talent to preach since the age of seventeen.

In his early years in Paris, he was influenced by the intellectuals and artistic life of the city. He visited churches and the annual Salon exhibitions at the Louvre. This marked the beginning of a productive period in which he published his first and most renowned work, Essai sur l'architecture. Following his essay, he wrote several other works on art and music.

== Essai sur l'architecture ==
Laugier is best known for his Essay on Architecture published in 1753. In 1755 he published the second edition with a famous, often reproduced illustration of a primitive hut. His approach is to discuss some familiar aspects of Renaissance and post-Renaissance architectural practice, which he describes as 'faults'. These 'faults' induce his commentary on columns, the entablature, and on pediments.

Among faults he lists for columns are that of "being engaged in the wall", the use of pilasters, incorrect entasis (swelling of the column), and setting columns on pedestals. Being embedded in the wall detracts from the overall beauty and aesthetic nature of columns; Laugier states that columns should be free. He goes on to assert that the use of pilasters should strictly be frowned upon especially since in nearly every case columns could be used instead. The second fault is created by incorrect proportion, and the last he believes is more of an unintelligible design. Resting columns on pedestals, he says, is like adding a second set of legs beneath the first pair.

The Essai sur l'architecture includes his thoughts on several other topics, ranging from solidity, the different orders, and how to construct different buildings.

With the collaboration of the journalist and theatre historian Antoine de Léris and Antoine Jacques Labbet, abbé de Morambert, he edited the first French review of music, Sentiment d'un harmonophile sur différents ouvrages de musique ("Amsterdam", i.e. Paris:Jombert, 1756).

== Published works ==
- Essai sur l'architecture (1753)
- A critical review of the Salon
- A pamphlet defending French music against Rousseau
- A translation from Italian
