= San Chao Chet =

Coordinates: 13°43′48.54″N 100°31′1.84″E

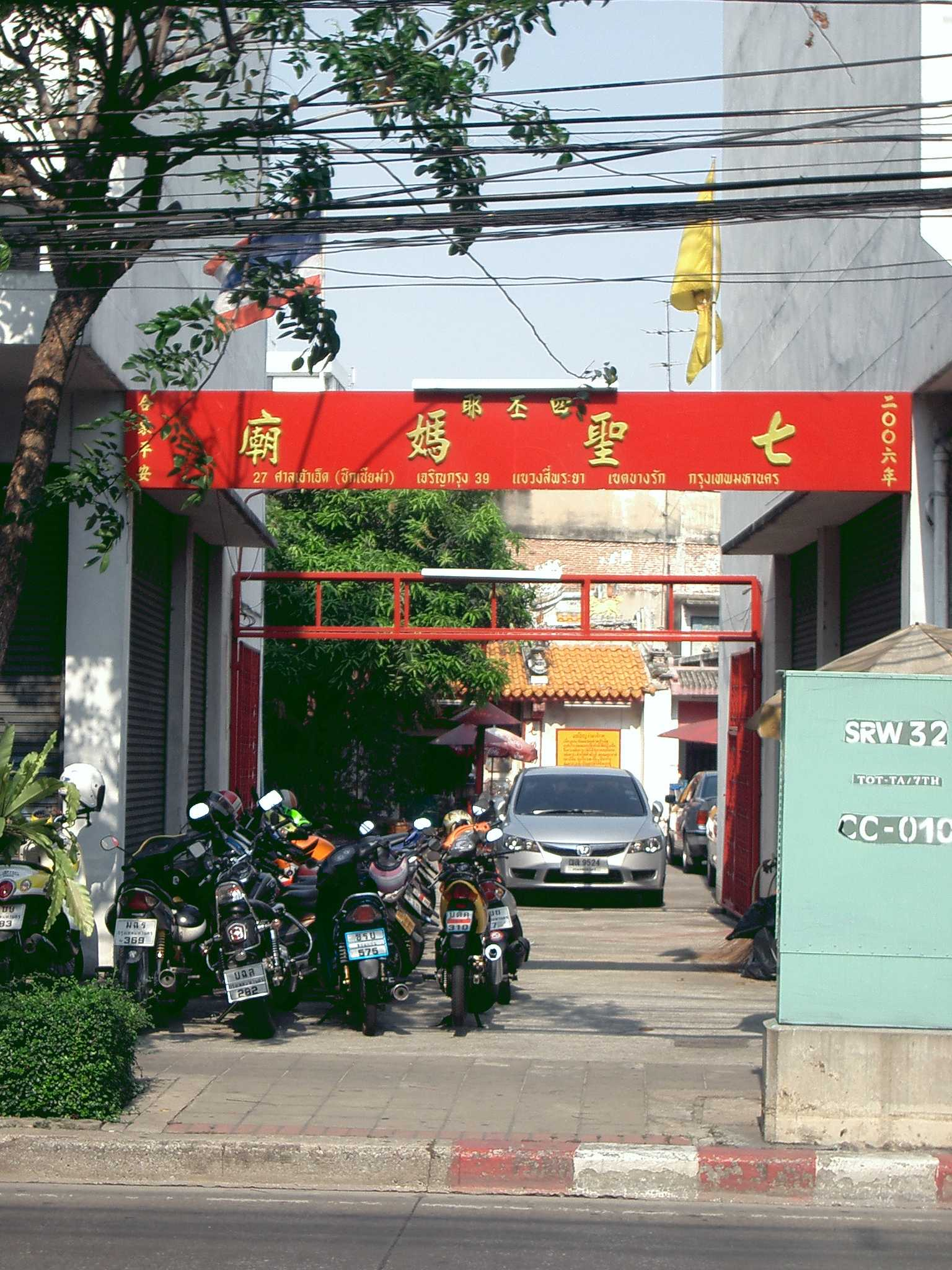
- Main Gate

Chinese name
- Traditional Chinese: 七聖媽廟
- Simplified Chinese: 七圣妈庙
- Literal meaning: 7 Holy Mother(s) Temple
Transcriptions
Standard Mandarin
- Hanyu Pinyin: Qīshèngmā Miào
- Wade–Giles: Ch‘i-shêng-ma Miao

Thai name
- Thai: Thai: ศาลเจ้าเจ็ด /sǎːn tɕâːw tɕèt/ Shrine of the Seven

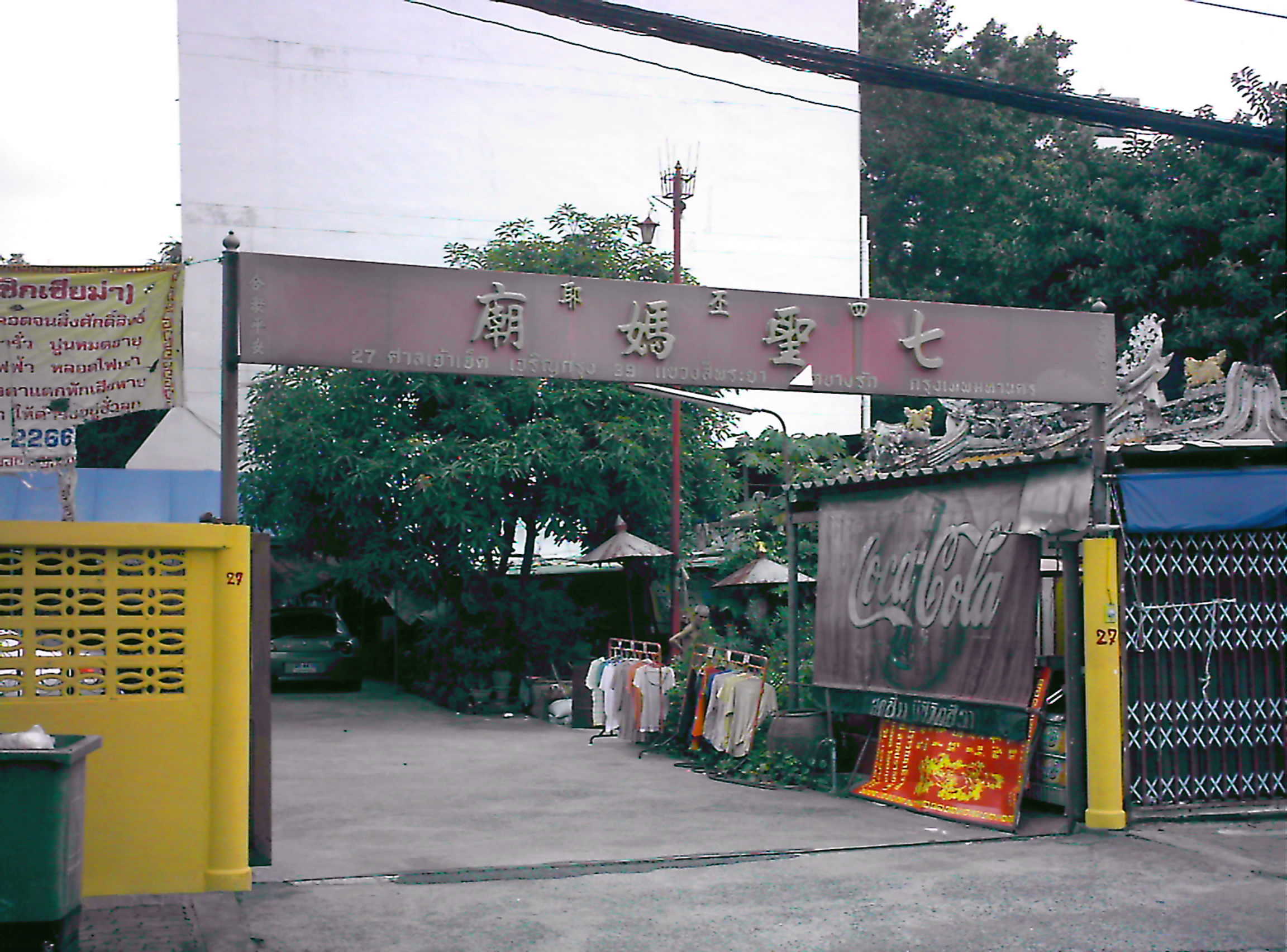
Side Gate of San Chao Chet, Bangkok

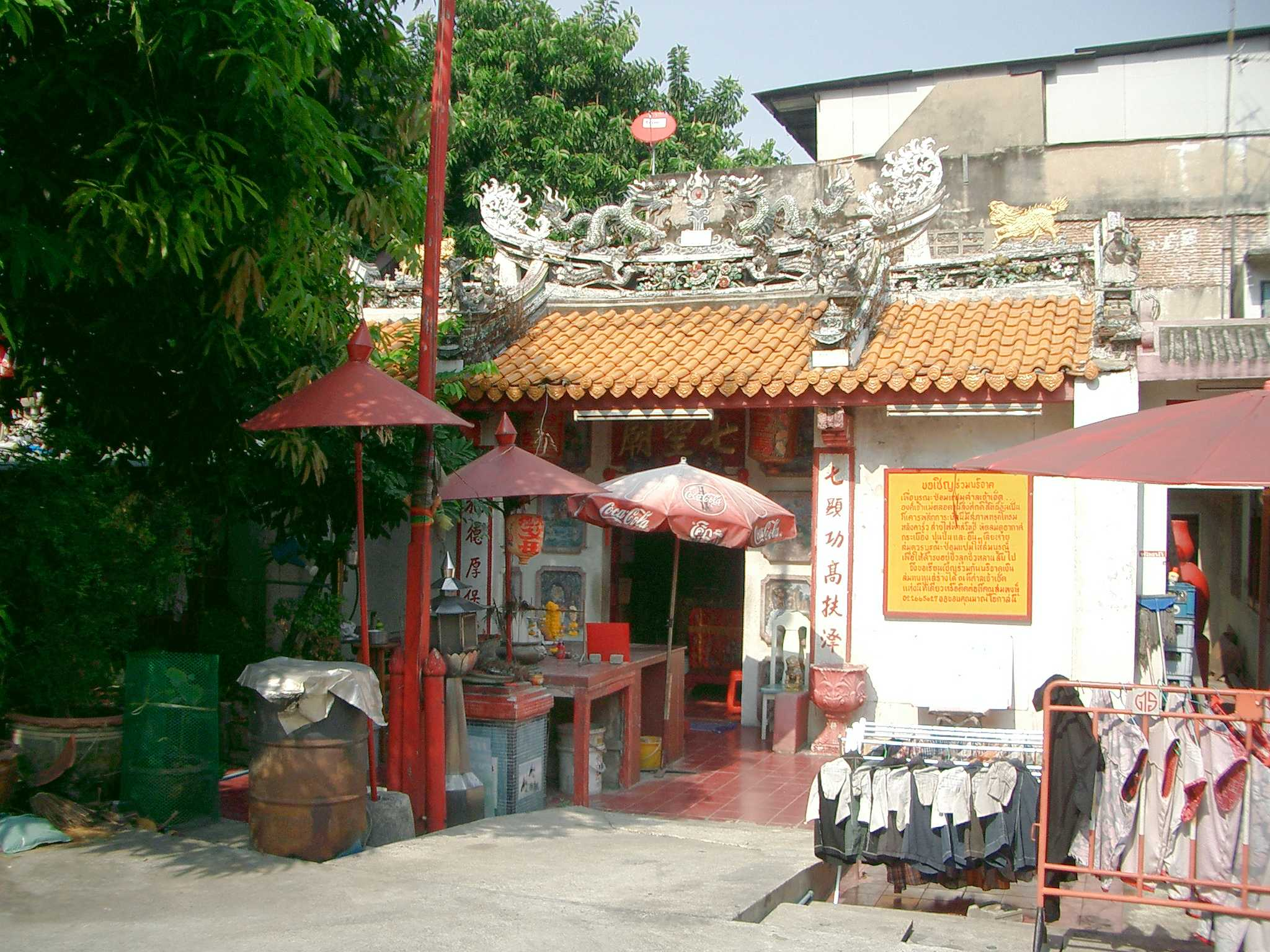
Main Hall of San Chao Chet, Bangkok

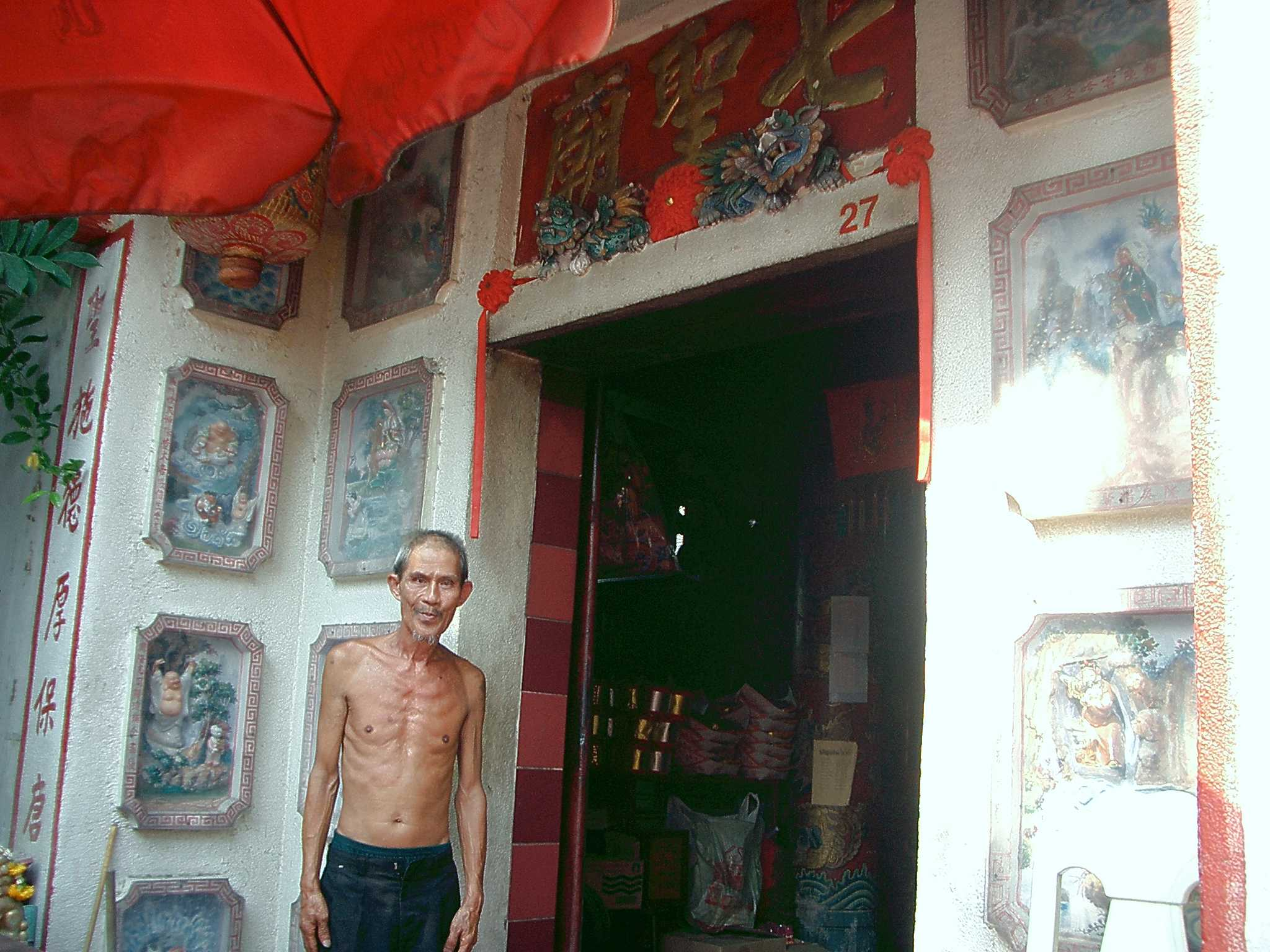
Old shrine keeper beside the main entrance, San Chao Chet, Bangkok

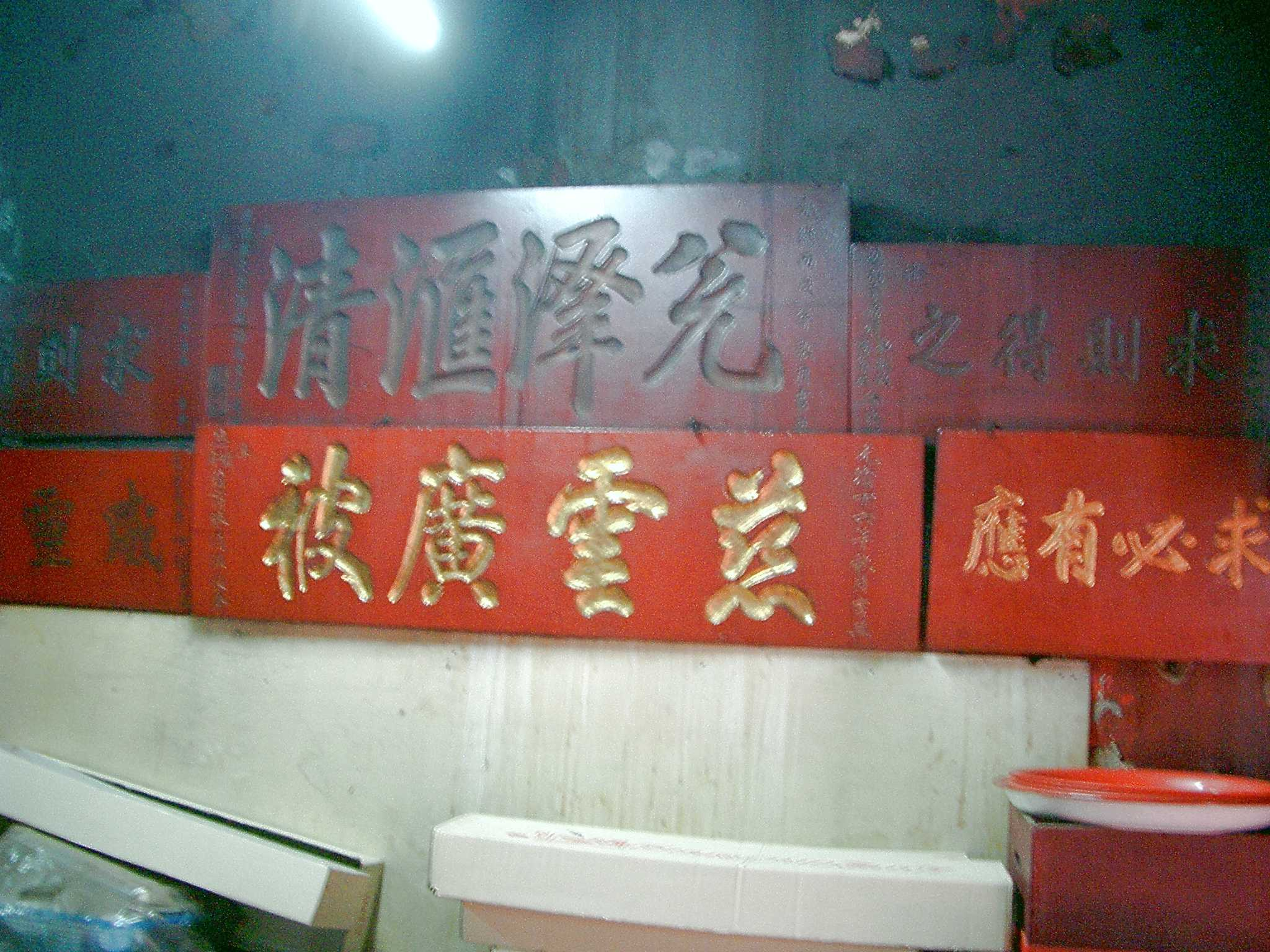
San Chao Chet keeps historic plaques

San Chao Chet is a temple to Goddess Mazu, Chinese Goddess of Sea and Patron Deity of fishermen, sailors and any occupations related to sea/ocean. The temple is located on the east bank of the Chao Phraya River in the Bang Rak District of Bangkok in Thailand, and is named after the seven statues of Goddess Mazu.

== History ==
San Chao Chet was built by Cantonese in Bangkok in 1882.

== Address ==
- English: 27 Soi San Chao Chet, Soi Charoen Krung 39, Si Phraya, Bang Rak, Bangkok 10500, Thailand.
- Thai: ๒๗ ศาลเจ้าเจ็ด (ซิกเซียม่า) ซอยเจริญกรุง ๓๙ ถนนเจริญกรุง เเขวงสี่พระยา เขตบางรัก กรุงเทพมหานคร ๑๐๕๐๐ ประเทศไทย
- Chinese: 泰國, 曼谷大京都, 挽叻縣, 四丕耶區, 石龍軍39街, 七聖廟社 27號, 郵政區號:10500.

== Architecture ==
- Couplet (Duilian) beside the entrance: ”七顯功高扶澤國 (Protect the sea); 聖施德厚保唐民 (Take care of Chinese immigrants]).”
- Central Altar: 7 different Mazu statues, made from ceramics, teak and bronze.
- Left Altar: Guanyin (Avalokiteśvara).
  - Couplet (Duilian) beside Left Altar: ”聖水柳枝照大地(Holy water and willow protect the earth); 靈丹寶瓶轉乾坤 (The pills from the vase can let the patient be recovered).”
- Right Altar: Gautama Buddha, General Guan Yu, Tu Di Gong and King Chulalongkorn.
  - Couplet (Duilian) beside Right Altar: ”福德英靈保黎庶 (Ancestral spirits protect people); 伯公顯赫賜財源 (Powerful uncles give financial resources).”

== Historic Plaques ==
San Chao Chet keeps 6 pieces of historic plaques with Chinese calligraphy:

- “求必有應” (Request must be responded to.)
- Mr. Leung Shi Hing and Ms. Tsang Chai Chun dedicated “威靈顯赫 (Powerful spirits)“ at Mid-Autumn Festival of 1851:
  - origin calligraphy:咸豐元年仲秋吉立:”威靈顯赫”, 弟子梁示興, 曾際春敬酧.
- Mr. Lai Kwan La and Ms. Lun Kwan Tai, 2 Cantonese dedicated ”求則得之 (Pray then get it)” in December 1882:
  - origin calligraphy:光緒八年歲次壬午仲冬吉:”求則得之”, 沐恩弟子廣府黎觀敕雷群大仝敬酬.
- Mr. Wong Kan Ting dedicated ”求則得之 (Pray then get it)” in the early spring of 1884:
  - origin calligraphy:光緒十年孟春吉立:”求則得之”, 沐恩弟子黃庚廷敬酧.
- Mr. Kwok Yi Luk, a Hainanese dedicated ”光澤匯清 (Recover soon)” for his health in autumn of 1886:
  - origin calligraphy:光緒丙戌年秋月吉旦:”光澤匯清”, 沐恩瓊府文邑郭貽祿為求平安敬奉.
- Mr. Lam Hung Kit, a Hainanese merchant dedicated ”慈雲廣被 (Merciful spirits always bless)” in autumn of 1890:
  - origin calligraphy:光緒十六年秋月吉旦:”慈雲廣被”,沐恩瓊府信商林鴻傑敬奉.
