= Dresden school =

Baroque Neo-Renaissance architectural style

The Dresden school was a baroque Neo-Renaissance architectural style developed in Dresden, Germany, primarily by Gottfried Semper and Hermann Nicolai. The style is associated with European architects mainly from Germany and Italy who built buildings and later city villas in large numbers, but also synagogues and public schools. Semper built the Dresden Semperoper, with the panther-quadriga (chariot) by sculptor Johannes Schilling (1828–1910). Important sculptors were Ernst Rietschel and Ernst Julius Hähnel.

== Music ==
The term is also used to describe the collective of musicians and composers who were based in the city from the middle 1600s. These included Johann Jakob Walther and Johann Paul von Westhoff, who influenced later German violinists such as Johann Sebastian Bach.

== See also ==
- Blue Wonder

== Sources ==
- Jarl Kremeier, "Dresden" Grove Art Online. Oxford University Press, [December 13, 2005].
