= Eisen (7th Sea) =

Role playing game supplement

- Publication date: 1 January 2000

Eisen is a 2000 role-playing game supplement for 7th Sea published by Alderac Entertainment Group.

== Contents ==
Eisen is a supplement in which information is included regarding the seven königreichen lands of the Iron Princes.

== Reviews ==
- Backstab #24
- Pyramid
- Games Unplugged #2 (Aug./Sept., 2000)
