= François Eisen =

French painter

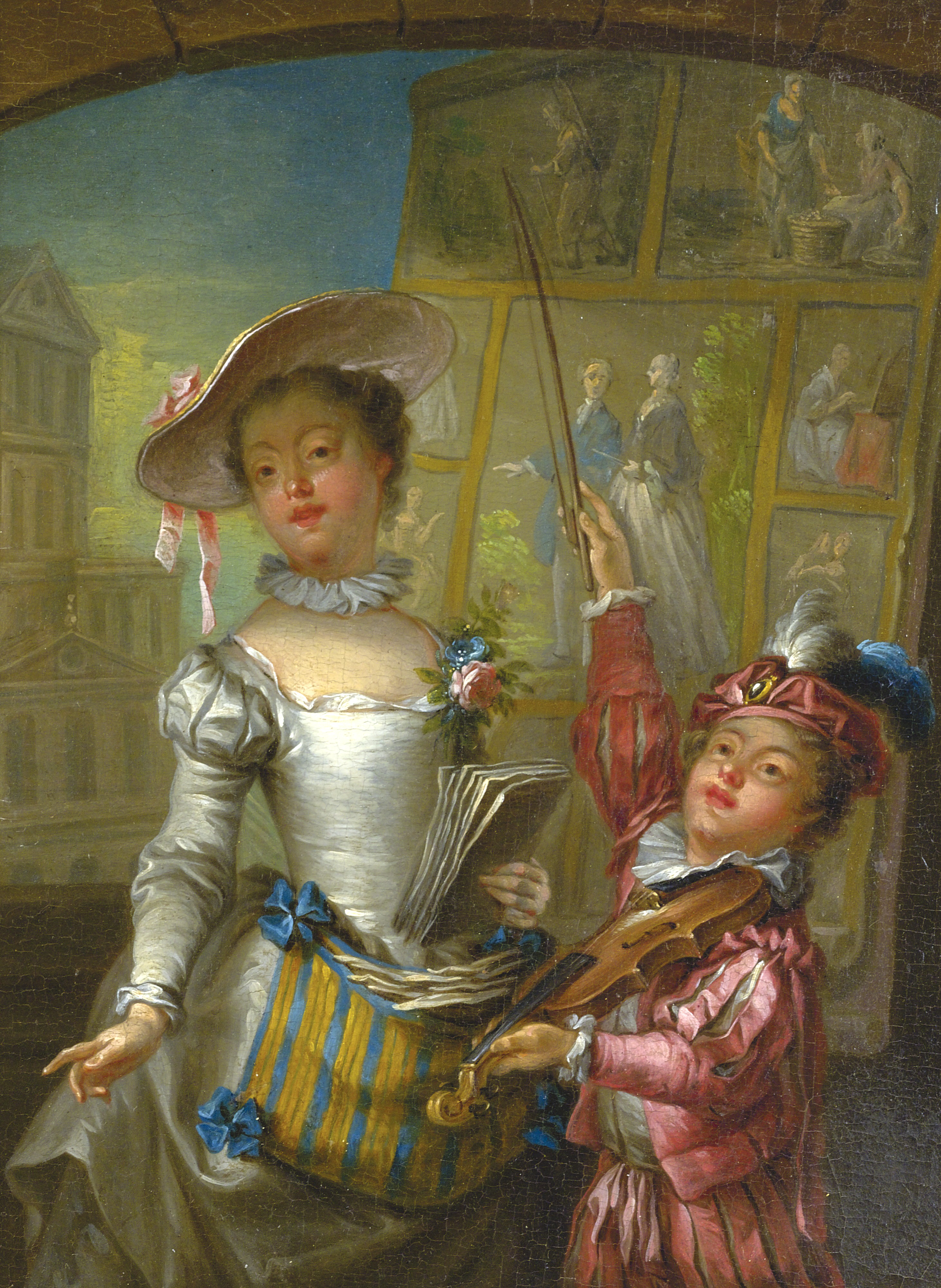
Street musicians by François Eisen, private collection, 1762

François Eisen, an engraver, as well as a painter of historical and genre subjects, was born at Brussels about 1685. When twenty years of age he went to Valenciennes, and remained there, painting many pictures for its churches and monastic institutions, until 1745, in which year he removed to Paris. At the age of ninety he, with his wife, was admitted into the Hospital for Incurables, where he was still living in 1778. There are two of his works in the Museum of Valenciennes, a Vision of St. Mary Magdalen, and an Astrologer. He etched a plate from the picture by Rubens of Christ giving the Keys to St. Peter, which was in the church of St. Gudule at Brussels.
