= Okuda Eisen =

Japanese potter (1753–1811)

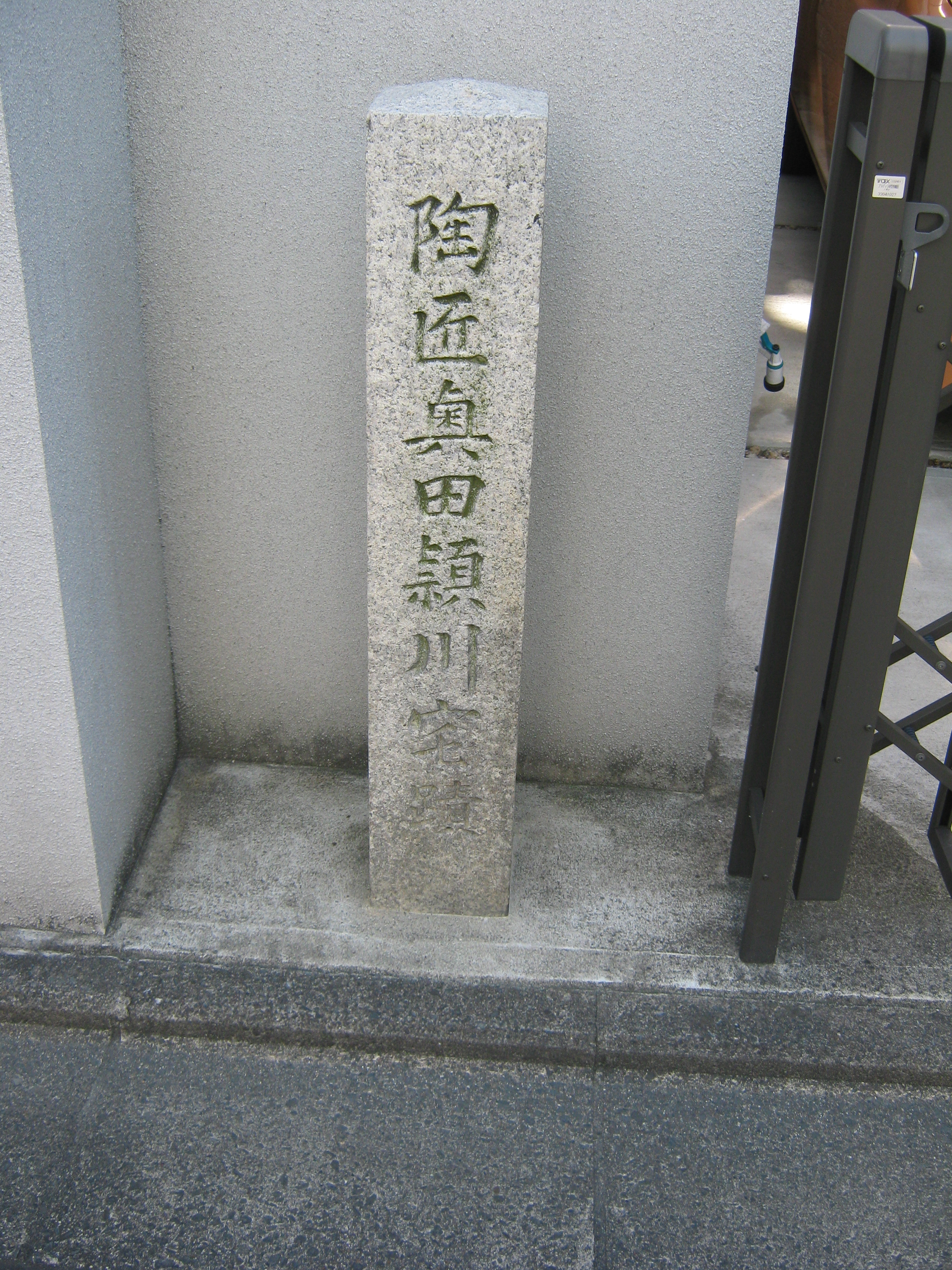
The remains of Okuda Eisen's house, Kyoto

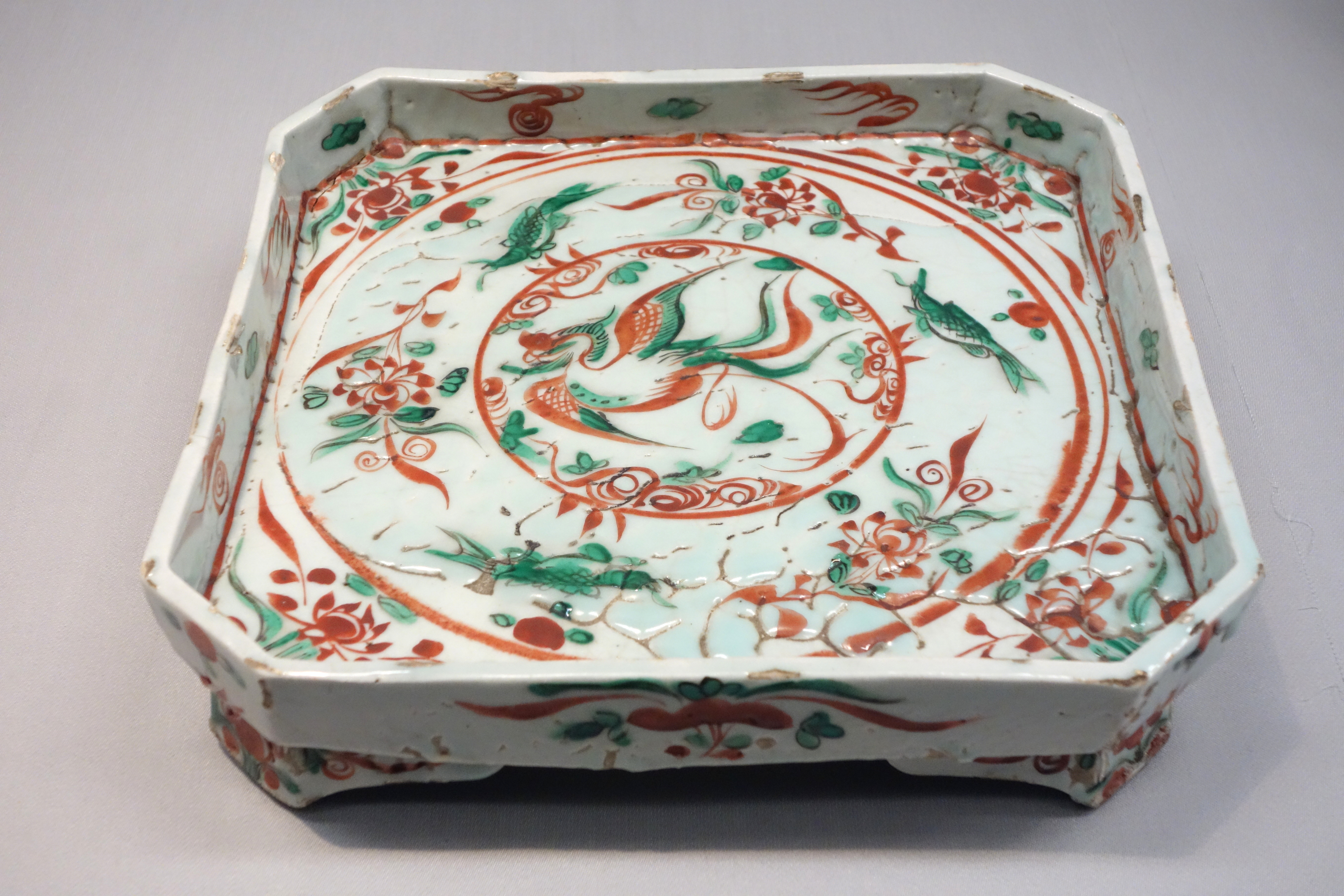
Bevel-edged footed tray attributed to Okuda Eisen

Okuda Eisen (奥田 穎川; 1753–1811) was a Japanese potter of the Edo period.

Eisen was born in Kyoto, evidently the grandson of Chinese immigrants, and adopted into the Okuda family of pawnbrokers. Although he inherited the family business, at age 35 he devoted his attention to amateur pottery, and by the 1780s he was producing copies of late Ming-period enamelled porcelain. He also made kochi (polychrome ware), sometsuke (underglaze cobalt or blue-and-white) and ko akae (old red ware) as utensils for the tea ceremony and for drinking sencha (green tea). His disciples included Aoki Mokubei, Kinkodo Kamesuke (1764-1837), and Nin'ami Dohachi (1783-1855).
