= Four Heavenly Kings (ex-Kōfuku-ji) =

Statues of the Four Heavenly Kings dispersed across multiple collections

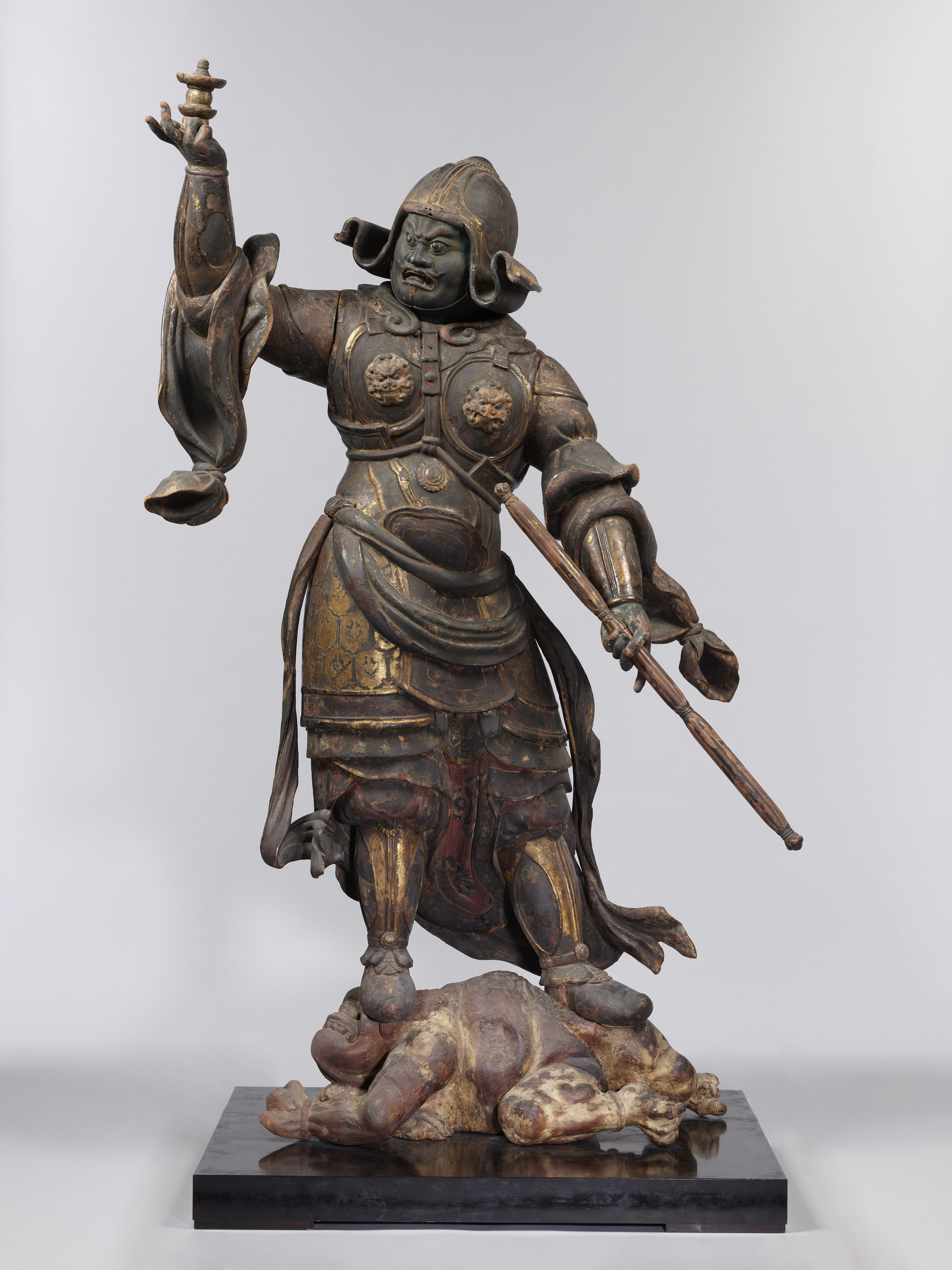
- Tamonten

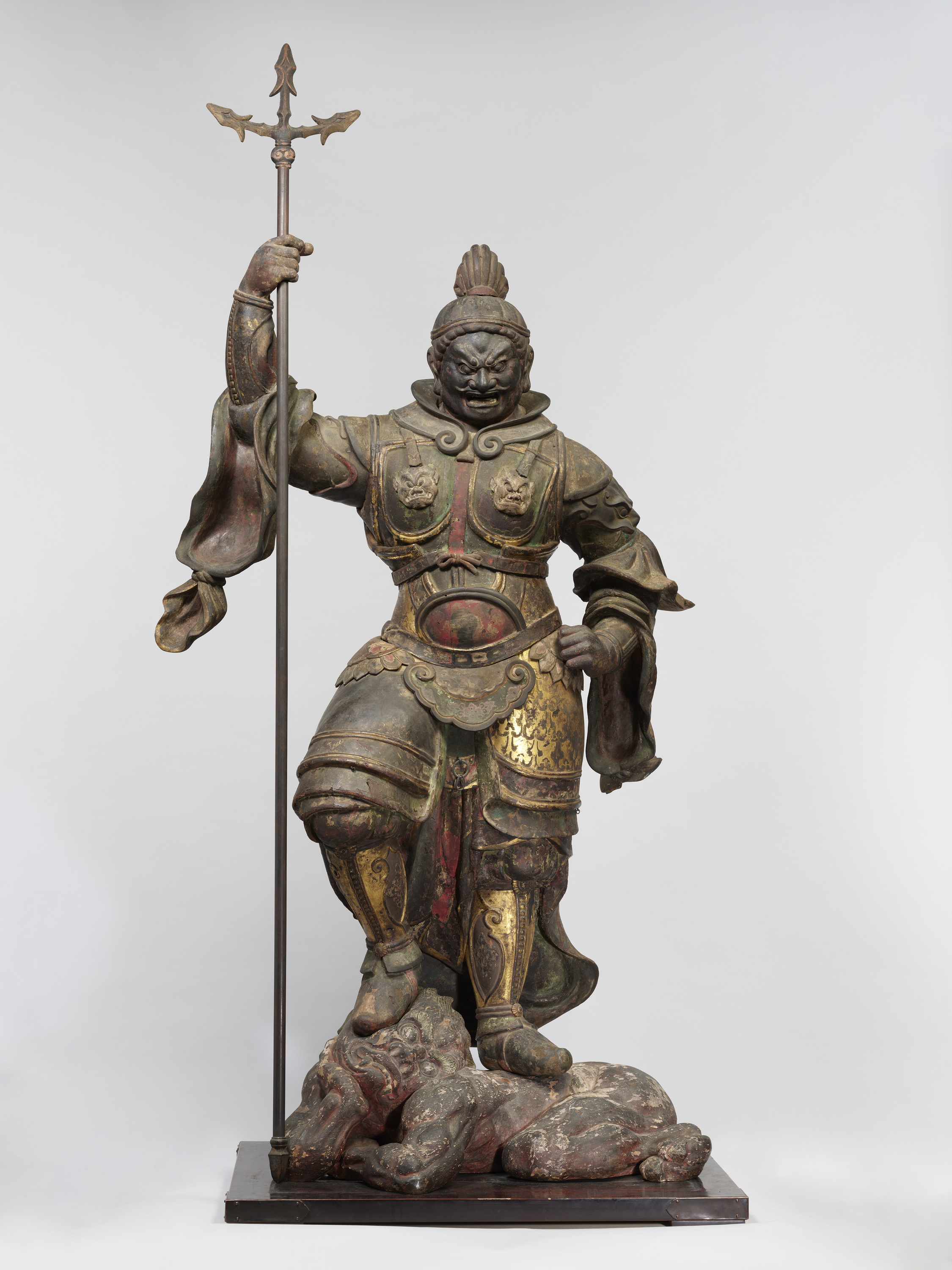
- Zōchōten
- Type: Buddhist sculpture
- Material: hinoki
- Size: Jikokuten - 155.5 cm Zōchōten - 163.2 cm Komokuten - 157.4 cm Tamonten - 155.5 cm
- Created: Heian period to Early Kamakura period
- Present location: Kofuku-ji, Nara National Museum, Miho Museum
- Classification: Important Cultural Property

The Statues of the Four Heavenly Kings from Kōfuku-ji are a set of dispersed Japanese Buddhist sculptures depicting the Four Heavenly Kings dating to the Heian to Kamakura period. Formerly held by Kōfuku-ji in Nara, Japan, and among the multiple set of Shitennō carved for the temple, they were dispersed during the Meiji Period in 1906. Two of the sculptures, depicting Vaiśravaṇa (Tamonten) and Virūḍhaka (Zōchōten) are currently held by the Nara National Museum, while the sculpture of Dhṛtarāṣṭra (Jikokuten) is held by the Miho Museum in Shiga Prefecture, with the sculpture of Virūpākṣa (Komokuten) remaining at the temple. Though dispersed, they are all considered Important Cultural Properties and serve as examples of the transition of conventions from Heian style to Kamakura style.

== History ==
Multiple sets of Shitennō were erected at Kōfuku-ji throughout the temple's history, including the Eastern Golden Hall (東金堂, Tōkon-dō), the North Octagonal Hall (北円堂, Hokuen-dō), and two groups in the South Octagonal Hall (南円堂, Nanendō), with one from that set that transitioned over the new Central Golden Hall (中金堂, Chū-kondō).

The dispersed set was speculated to be also from the Northern Hall though its provenance remains unknown. The styles resemblance to the Late Heian variants found at Tōdai-ji, and comparisons with the Central Golden Hall and the Southern Golden Hall indicates a lineage within the boundaries of the late Heian-early Kamakura, though scholars remain divided on its specific date, as well as the identity of the sculptor, who is presumably locally based in Nara.

By the Meiji era, haibutsu kishaku and shinbutsu bunri, the policies ending widespread Buddhist influence during the end of the Tokugawa shogunate, resulted in the disrepair of Kōfuku-ji. The Shitennō were seen in disrepair in photos taken by Ogawa Kazumasa in 1888 with the heads and bodies of three of the Shitennō swapped between each other.

In 1906, Masuda Takashi of Mitsui & Co. purchased many of the statues in bulk (the three guardian kings were purchased for a total price of 5000 Yen, with the repairs completed by sculptor Takeuchi Kyuichi (竹内久一) and lacquer artist Ito Inuya Sadafumi (伊東乾谷貞文), which was documented inside the Tamonten statue, prior to the eventual transfer of the works to the Nara National Museum and Miho Museum.

In 2024, the Nara National Museum sculptures, Tamonten and Zōchōten saw signs of deterioration with the surface paint peeling, as well as the wood splitting due to deterioration of the wood and the lacquer in the century since its past repair. As a result, they became recipients of the 2024 Bank of America Art Conservation Project, which involves the stabilizing of the statue, as well as addressing the cracks, loose joints, and peeling of the original paint, with augmented X-Ray and CT scans.

The statues were reunited as a set in the Masterpieces from the Collection of the Nara National Museum exhibit in 1997, with its next reunion scheduled in February 2026 thanks to the conservation repairs.

== Sculptures ==
All statues are generalized to be made of hinoki, with CT scan and the X-Ray analysis indicating usage of copper rivets in the heads, while the eyes are made of crystal.

=== Vaiśravaṇa (Tamonten) ===
Measuring 155.5 cm in height, with a stocky build and a short neck, he wears a fierce scowling expressing, mouth open, and an intense set of eyes, gazing upon a jeweled stupa on his right hand. The eyes are inlaid with a separate block of wood to emphasize rage. It holds a sacred staff on his left, while trampling on a demon's back with an outturned left foot. The head was made separate from the body and attached to the neck, and the body is hollow. The armor is made with gold leaf adhered to lacquer. Unlike the other statues of the set, the arms use dovetail joints, the lower legs at the shins utilize a hook shaped joint, and the demon was carved with another piece of vertical wood similar to the main body. It was designated Important Cultural Property on 23 January 1933, under designation number 00093, and is designated as 755–0 at the Nara National Museum.

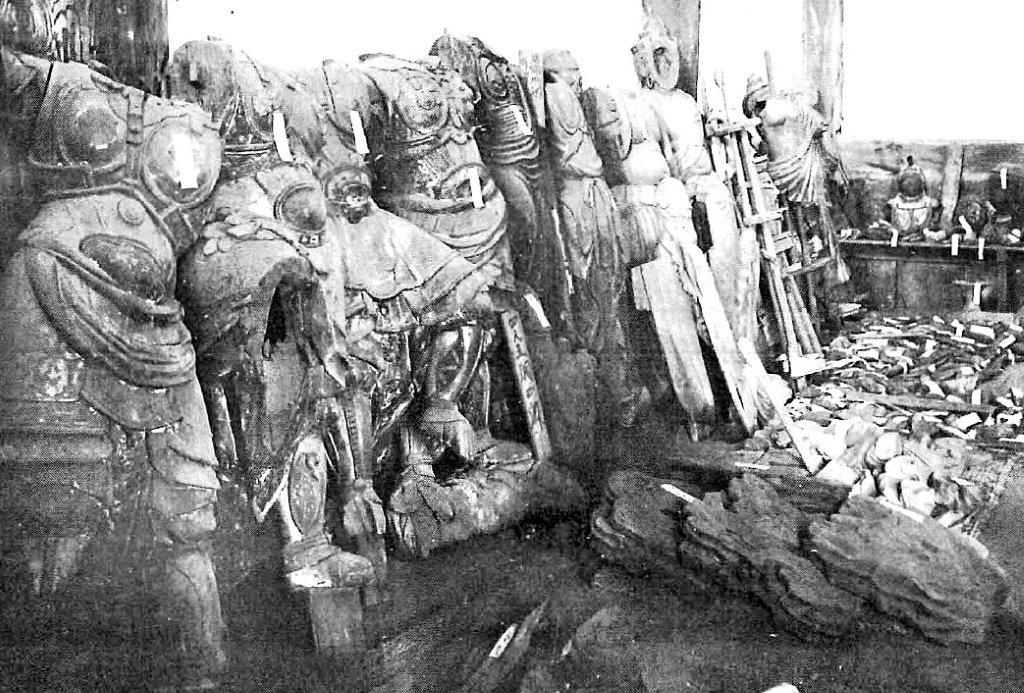
Old photo of damaged Buddha in the East Golden Hall of Kofuku-ji Temple in 1888, by Ogawa Kazumasa; the Shitennō are seen in disrepair.

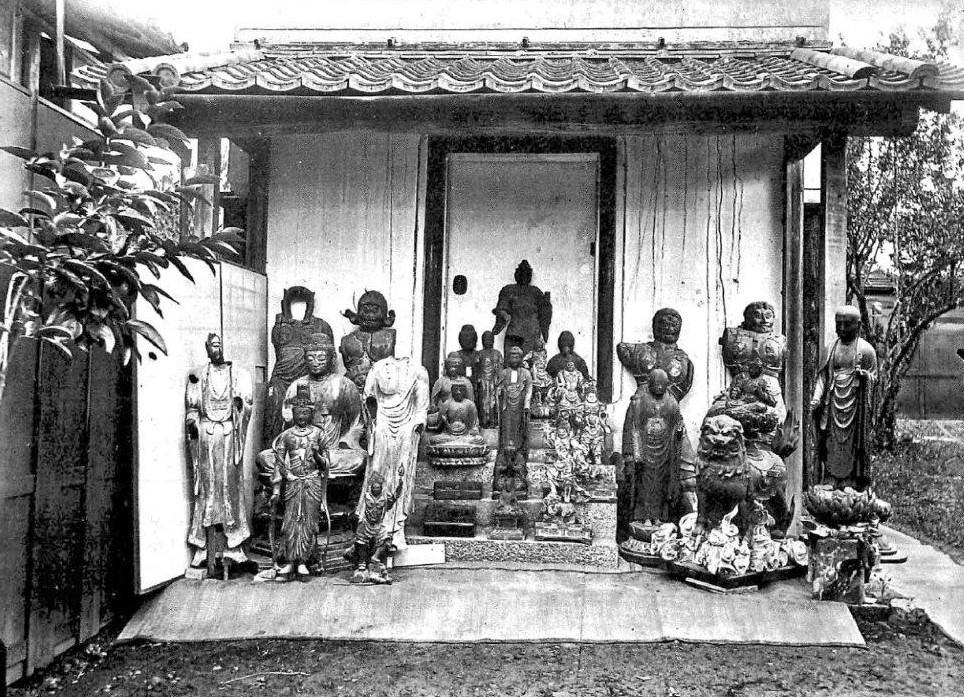
The 1906 lot photo purchase by Masuda Takashi. Other sculptures seen is the Boston Miroku (MFA Boston), Statue of Jizō (Intan) (Metropolitan Museum of Art), and the Statues of Brahmā and Indra (Asian Art Museum (San Francisco)). Three of the Shitennō are in the back.

=== Virūḍhaka (Zōchōten) ===
Measuring 163.2 cm, Zōchōten holds a trident on his right hand, his left on his hips, also rotated leftward. He too stands on a demon, right foot on its head, and left on its back. While restrained and stoic in posture, his face also forms a fierce expression, with an imposing style rendered with heavy build and muscles covered in armor. Conservation work was done on the face using resin, glue and lacquer to stabilize the damage done to warping, shrinking, and insect damage. It received Important Cultural Property status on 30 April 1935, under designation number 00125, and is designated as 1114–0 at the Nara National Museum.

=== Dhṛtarāṣṭra (Jikokuten) ===
Measuring 170.7 cm, Jikokuten was carved one piece of cypress, with the head and arms made separately. He is covered in armor, the body was made to be sturdy in nature with short neck, fiery glare, and vibrant colors, which flaked off. Trace polychromy on the face and fingers indicate it was once painted in green. It was designated an Important Cultural Property on 5 September 1944.

=== Virūpākṣa (Komokuten) ===
Measuring 157.4 cm, Komokuten is the only remaining statue of the set that remains under ownership of Kōfuku-ji, though it has been entrusted to the Nara National Museum. The temple describes the statue as carved from Cercidiphyllum (katsura). It received its designation of Important Cultural Property on 17 April 1902.
