= Statues of Brahmā and Indra =

Kofuku-ji bodhissatva statues now held in the Asian Art Museum, San Fran

Statues of Brahma and Indra
- 梵天・帝釈天立像
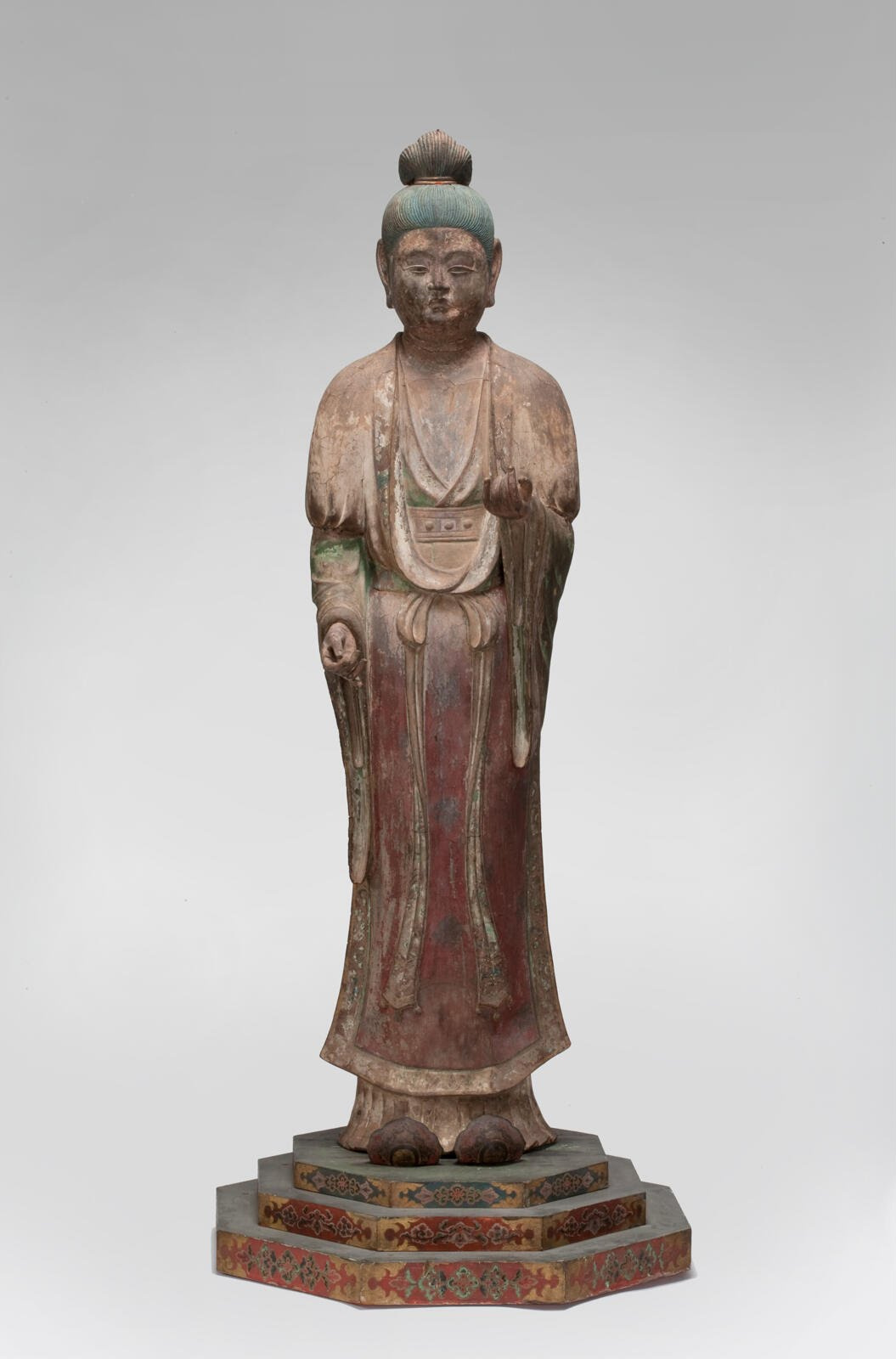
- Brahmā (Bonten)

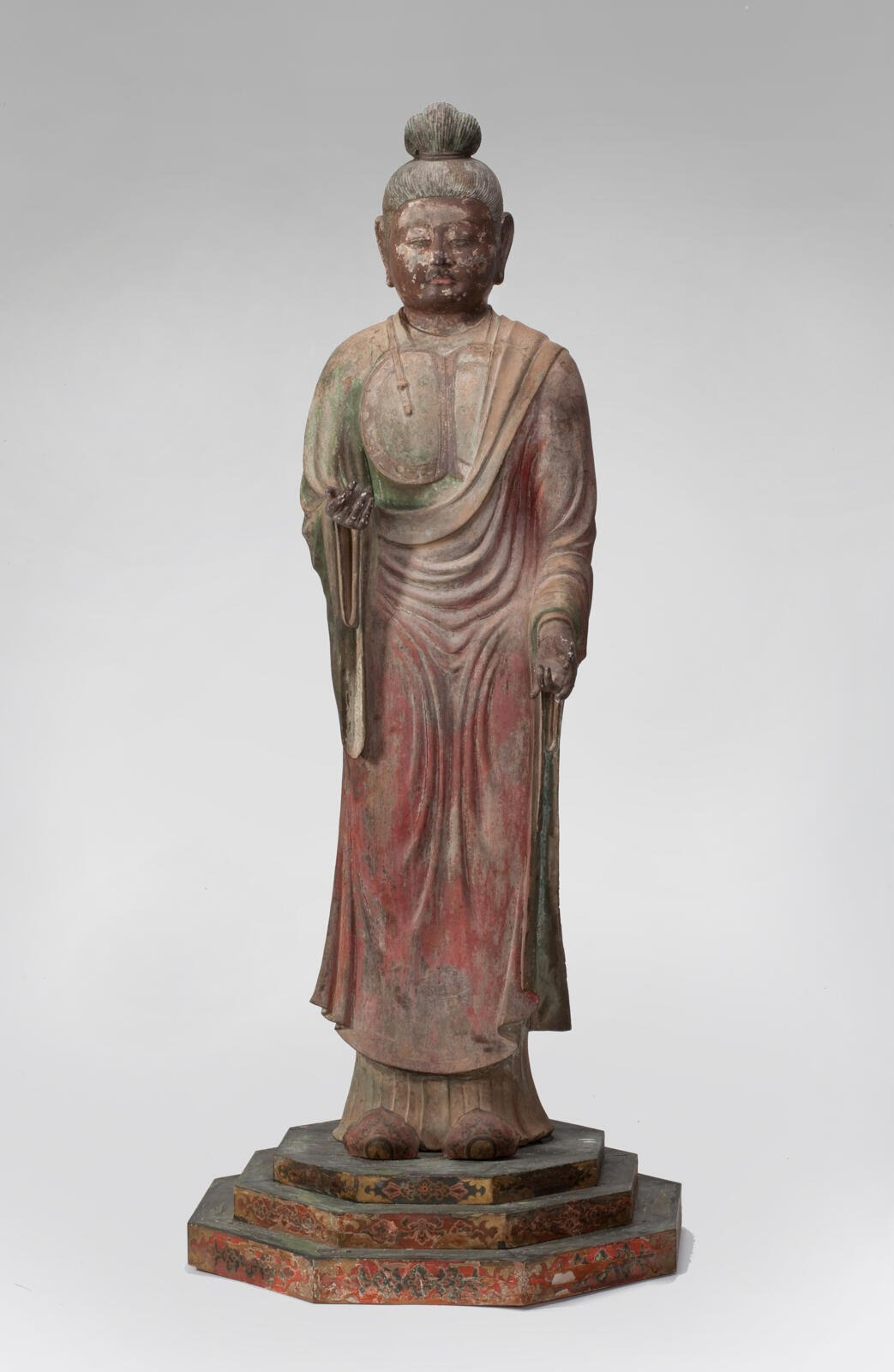
- Indra (Taishakuten)
- Material: Hollow Dry Lacquer
- Size: 157.5 x 39.4 x 66 cm
- Created: Kofuku-ji, Nara, Japan circa 733 (730s-750s)
- Present location: Asian Art Museum

The Statues of Brahmā and Indra, or Bonten and Taishakuten are a pair of Nara period Buddhist sculptures made in the 730s-750s, depicting the Buddhist deities Brahmā and Indra. Made of lacquer, it was venerated at Kōfuku-ji. Among the many statues that dispersed in the Meiji Restoration, they were sold off by the temple, and ended up in the collection of Avery Brundage, who built up the founding collection of the Asian Art Museum in San Francisco, where the statues now are.

== Provenance ==
Brahmā and Indra respectively were incorporated into the Buddhist pantheon from the Hindu pantheon approximately the 1st-century BC. With the importation of Tang dynasty culture to Japan during the Asuka period and the Nara period, the Hosso school of Buddhism quickly took hold, helmed by the Fujiwara clan, who made Kōfuku-ji their patron temple.

In the 730s, the Western Golden Hall of the temple was constructed, and commissioned by Empress Kōmyō, in memory of her mother, Agata no Inukai no Michiyo, or Lady Tachibana. Among the sculptures made included the Eight Mythical Beings, and the Ten Great Disciples, now currently designated National Treasures of Japan. The statue pairs were part of the same group, with records indicating that they moved between the West Golden Hall and East Golden Hall throughout the temple's history.

In 1717, the Western Golden Hall burned down, though many of the statues remaining in the hall that survived are now in the National Treasure Hall.

Kōfuku-ji saw further disrepair during the Meiji government's policy of shinbutsu bunri and haibutsu kishaku, the separation of Buddhism and Shintoism. In the 1890s, out of necessity to maintain the temple's infrastructure. Kōfuku-ji sold off many of their holdings, of which the pair was included.

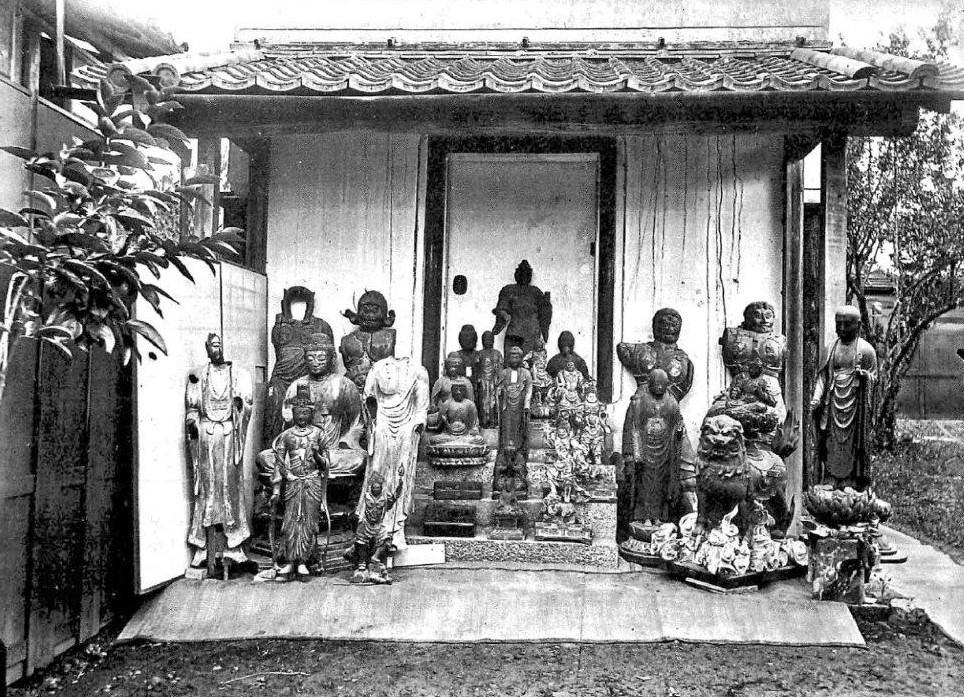
A photo of Bonten and Taishakuten from a photo of Kōfuku-ji's holdings in 1901, standing next to the Boston Miroku (Museum of Fine Arts, Boston) and together with the Statue of Jizō (Intan) (Metropolitan Museum of Art), and Four Heavenly Kings.

Brahmā and Indra were sold to Masuda Takashi of Mitsui in 1906 for a price of 2000 yen. The statues, missing hands, head, and feet, were sent to Niiro Chunosuke, founder of the Nihon Bijutsuin, for conservation and repairs, which were completed by 1927. The pair were put on display at the Masuda residence in Shinagawa.

In 1964, in the leadup to the 1964 Tokyo Olympics, the President of the IOC, Avery Brundage, also an avid art collector, was building up the inaugural collection of the Asian Art Museum (then called the Center of Asian Art and Culture) which was prepped for opening in 1966. The statues were purchased from the Masuda family for 138,000 USD.

== Description ==
Kōfuku-ji's Brahmā and Indra is considered the oldest surviving Japanese depiction of the deities. Cross-referenced depictions of the pair also include the Tōdai-ji Brahmā and Indra, dated to the 8th century, and currently housed in the Hokke-do.

Through the hollow dry lacquer technique, or dakkatsu kanshitsu, the pair were made of a clay core with wood support, layered with hemp cloth soaked in lacquer, like papier-mâché. After the coating hardened, the clay was removed with new wooden supports serving as the skeleton of the sculpture. The finishing details to the surface was made with sawdust and lacquer paste (kokuso), which rendered the finer details of the sculpture, and finished with polychromy. Given the light weight of lacquer, it allowed the sculptures to be evacuated during fires, and in addition proved water-proof and bug-resistant to decay. Subsequent repairs by Niiro Chunosuke included metal fasteners to attach the repaired head to the internal wood support, revealed through X-ray's by the Asian Art Museum for the Brahmā sculpture.
