= Boston Miroku =

Oldest sculpture of the Kamakura period artist, Kaikei

- 弥勒菩薩立像 一躯 (Miroku bosatsu ryûzô) (Japanese)
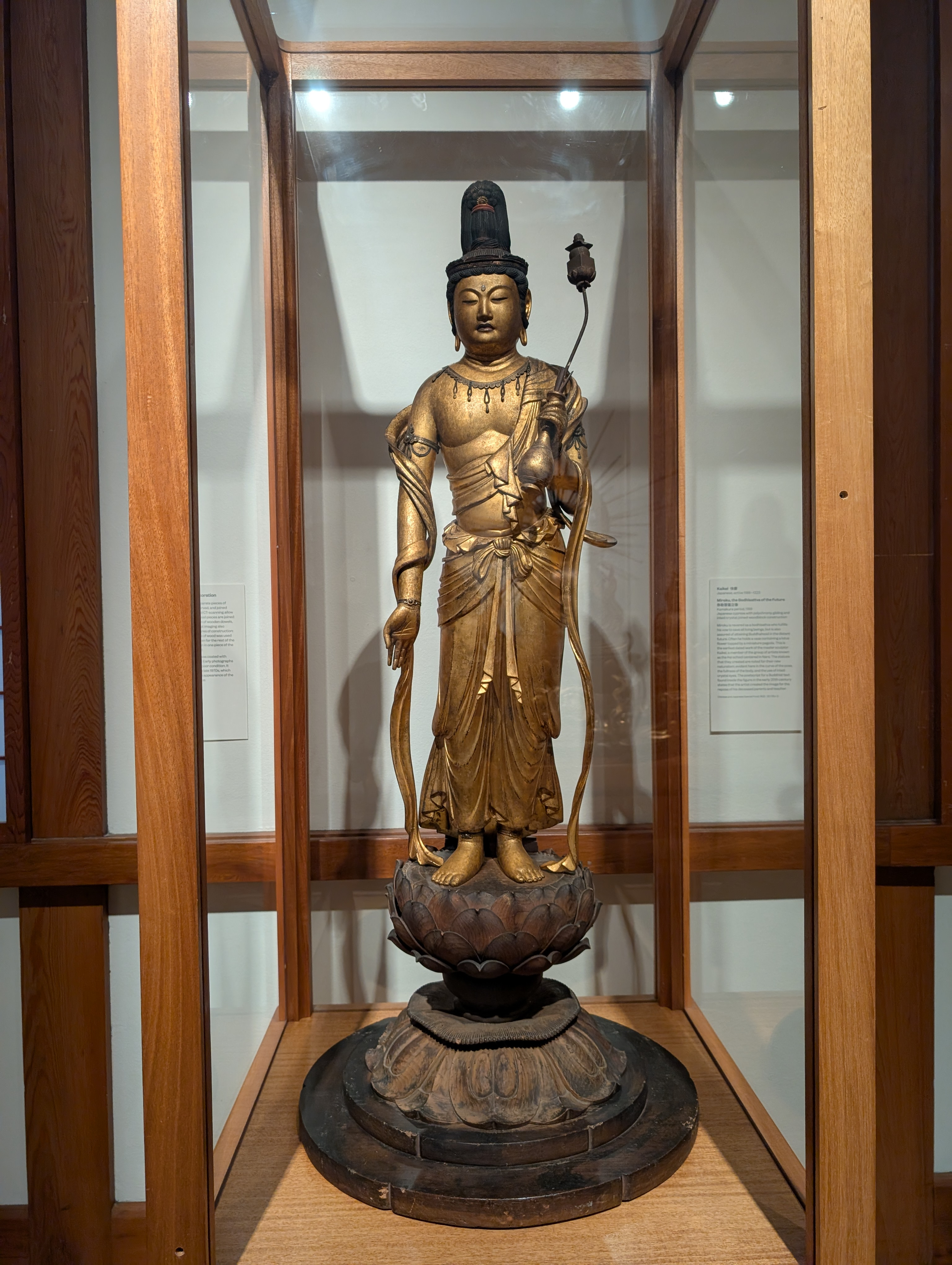
- Boston Miroku, now on display in the Japanese Temple Gallery of the Museum of Fine Arts, Boston
- Artist: Kaikei
- Year: 1189 (Bunji 5)
- Medium: Japanese cypress, gold, and inlaid crystal, split-and-joined construction
- Dimensions: 142.2 cm × 62.2 cm × 53.3 cm (56 in × 24.5 in × 21 in)
- Location: Museum of Fine Arts, Boston, Boston
- Accession: MFA 20.723.1
- Website: https://collections.mfa.org/objects/28592

The Boston Miroku is a Kamakura period wooden sculpture of Maitreya, the Buddha of the future. Carved by the Buddhist sculptor Kaikei in 1189, it was once held and venerated at Kōfuku-ji, Nara until the temple sold it in 1906. It was then acquired by the Museum of Fine Arts, Boston in 1920. It is considered to be the earliest extant work of Kaikei, who is recognized for his works as part of the Kei school of Buddhist sculpture.

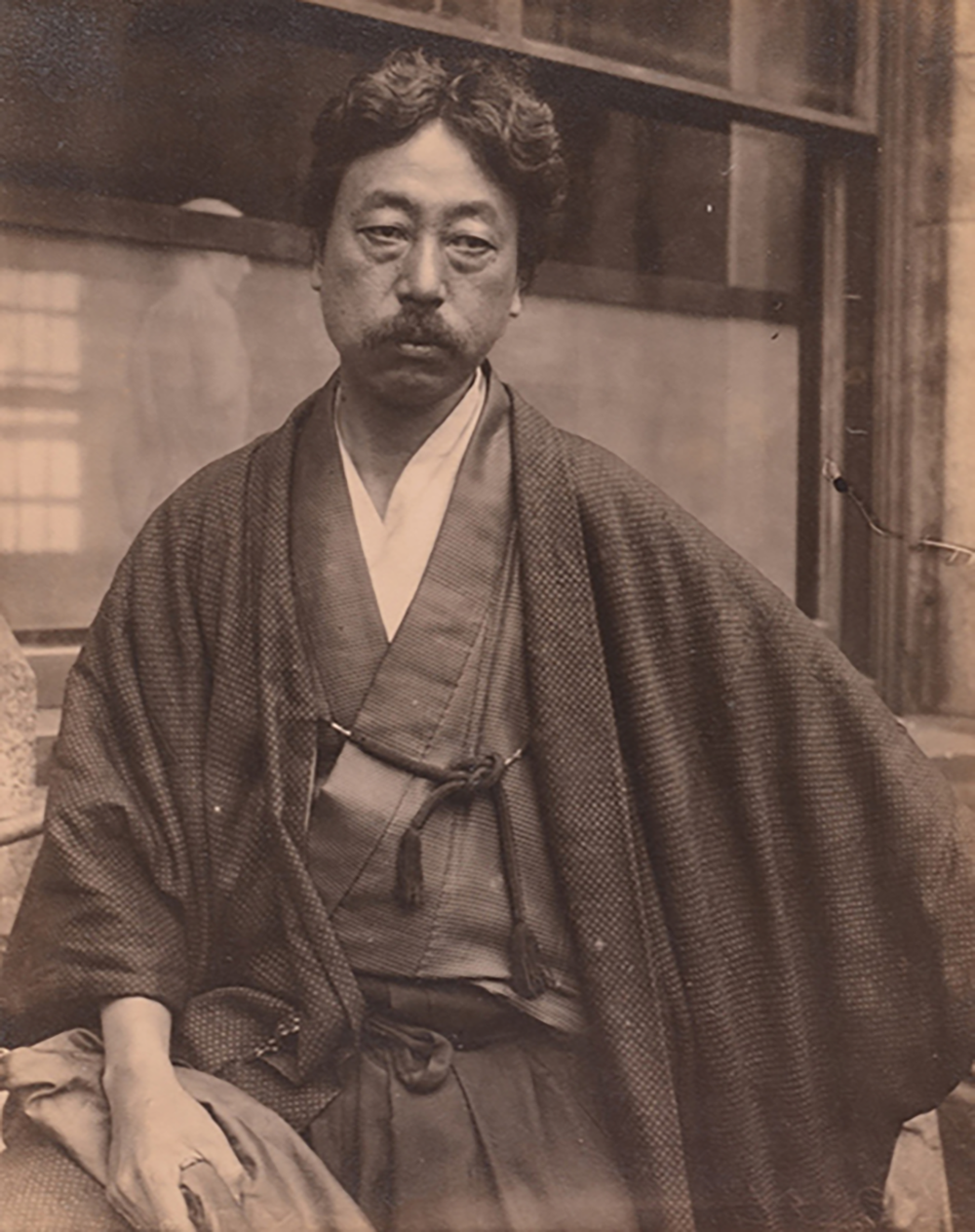
Okakura Kakuzo (1863–1913), owner of the Boston Miroku subsequent to Kōfuku-ji.

== Background ==
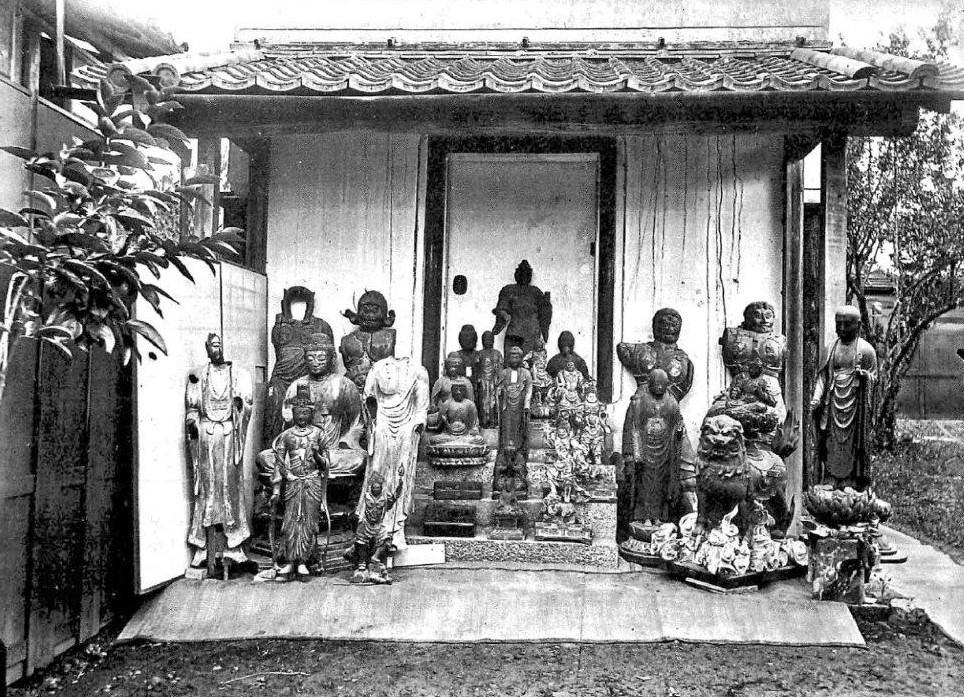
Set of statues from Kōfuku-ji that fell into disrepair (1901), the Boston Miroku is 2nd from the Left, standing in between the Statues of Brahmā and Indra. Intan Jizō seen on the far right, Four Heavenly Kings in the back.

The Kei school (Keiha, 慶派) was a studio consisting of sculptors who primarily operated in Nara and Kyoto, which initially was established by Jōchō, but was then flourished under the visage of Kōkei, who then trained his son, Unkei along with Kaikei.

In 1180, due to the Siege of Nara during the Genpei War, many prominent temples including Tōdai-ji and Kōfuku-ji got burnt, and thus in the decades following, the studio was commissioned to carry out much of the extensive restoration work for the temples in the city.

The Boston Miroku, carved in 1189, nine years after the battle is considered to represent an early phase of Kaikei, and was held by Kofuku-ji until 1906, when several of its holdings were sold for the temple's upkeep, a result of the fallout of the shinbutsu bunri by Haibutsu kishaku (separation of Buddhism and Shintoism). As part of this lot Masuda Takashi purchased the Miroku for 100 Yen, considerably cheaper than many of the other statues in the lot. The Miroku was then owned by scholar Okakura Kakuzō, where upon his passing in 1913, his estate gifted the sculpture to the MFA on 3 June 1920.

== Description ==
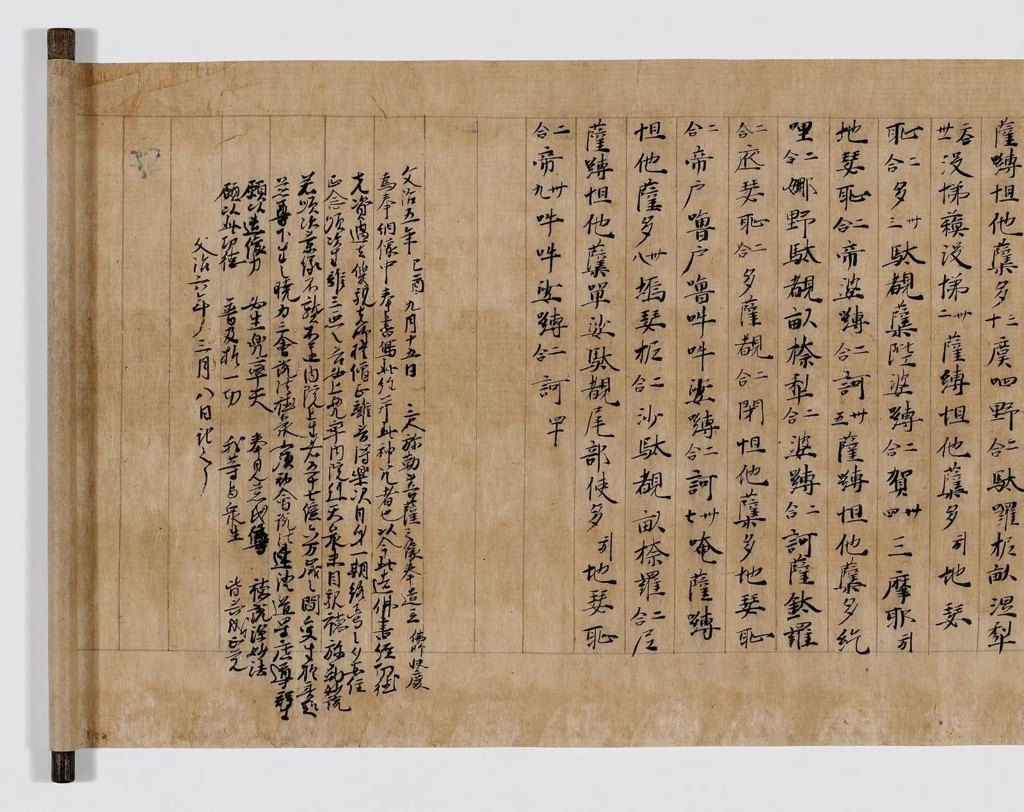
The Sutra on Maitreya's Past Lives, written by Kaikei in 1189 and found within the cavity of the Boston Miroku

The sculpture was verified as the earliest work manly thanks to the signature found at the bottom of the statue, because in the years following the Genpei War, the sculpture studios sought to credit their authorship, and as such Kaikei's signature was accompanied by kōshō ("skillful artisan") to his name. The Boston Miroku was signed "Busshi Kaikei" in a sutra found inside the cavity of the statue.

The Boston Miroku represents the first phase of Kaikei, modelled after his senior Kokei, characterized by naturalistic form, as well as bold drapery folds given to Miroku's attire. In addition, the realism of the sculpture represents a deviation from many previous orthodox forms of Japanese Buddhist sculptures, which would be represented in strains of his subsequent works, such as that of the Tōdai-ji Hachiman, and a Jizo statue.

This form would be known as "An Ami" style, named after Kaikei's second phase in 1192.

== See also ==
- Seated Shō Kannon - another sculpture within the MFA Boston collection
