= Statue of Jizō (Intan) =

Jizo statue formerly owned by Kofuku-ji at the MET

- 院湛作 地蔵菩薩立像 (Japanese)
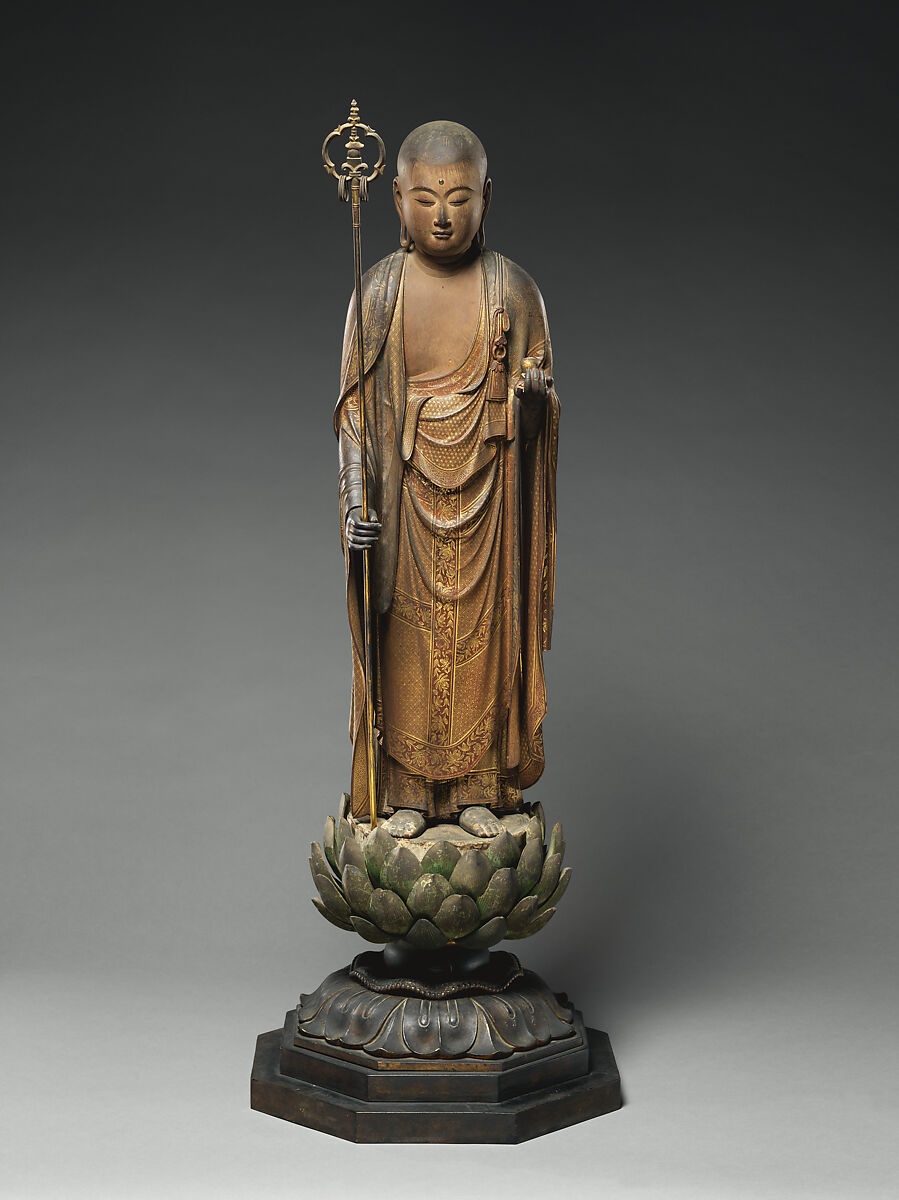
- Artist: Intan (院湛)
- Year: 1291
- Medium: Japanese cypress wood (hinoki) with polychrome pigments, gold paint (kindei), cut-gold leaf (kirikane), and rock crystal eyes
- Subject: Kṣitigarbha
- Dimensions: 135.9 cm × 27.9 cm (53.5 in × 11 in)
- Location: Metropolitan Museum of Art, New York City
- Accession: 2023.640a–c

The Statue of Jizō, or Josefowitz Jizō is a late 13th century wooden Kamakura period Buddhist Sculpture of the bodhisattva Kṣitigarbha. It was originally created for worship in Kōfuku-ji, Nara before being sold, entering the private collection of Samuel Josefowitz. It has seen exhibition as a loan by Josefowitz to the Metropolitan Museum of Art since 2012, to which the museum acquired full ownership after being sold at auction at Christie's in 2023.

== Provenance ==
Kōfuku-ji during the Kamakura period saw a surge in restoration work in the years following the Siege of Nara during the Genpei War. Multiple schools (studios) emerged as new sculptures were commissioned. Prominent examples include the Kei school (慶派), the En (Enpa) school (円派), and the In (Inpa) school (院派).

The Inpa were primarily based in Kyoto with close ties to Imperial Household but were active in Nara as well, and are credited towards the restoration of the Daibutsuden at Todai-ji, as well as construction of Sanjūsangen-dō.

The Jizō was sculpted by Inpa sculptor Intan (院湛), whose only known for two other sculptures: a seated Jizō at Joki-in in Mount Kōya, and a Kannon statue at Akishino-dera.

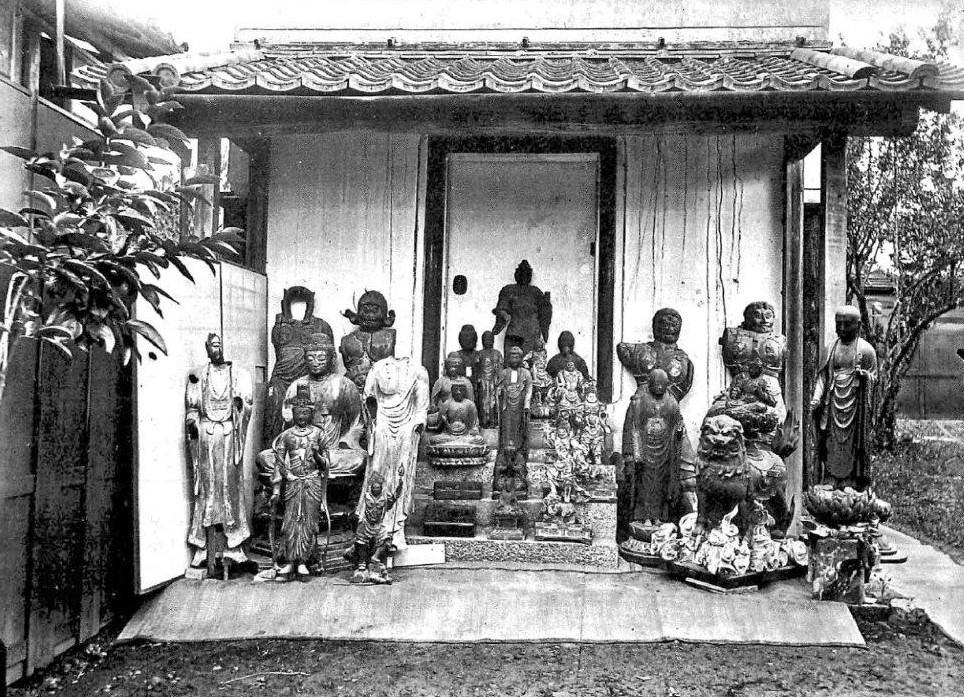
The sculpture at Kōfuku-ji during its sale in 1907. To the far left is the Boston Miroku, carved by Kaikei, along with the Statues of Brahmā and Indra, and Four Heavenly Kings.

The foot of the statue, carries the signature of the sculptor, in addition to the date of the 24th day, the 9th month, and 4th year of the Shōō era (1291).

In 1906, the sculptures of Kōfuku-ji were sold by temple to raise funds, ultimately a result of decline during the Meiji period policy of shinbutsu bunri and haibutsu kishaku. Many of the statues were acquired by industrialist Masuda Takashi, who also acquired the Burke Jizō (also in the MET).

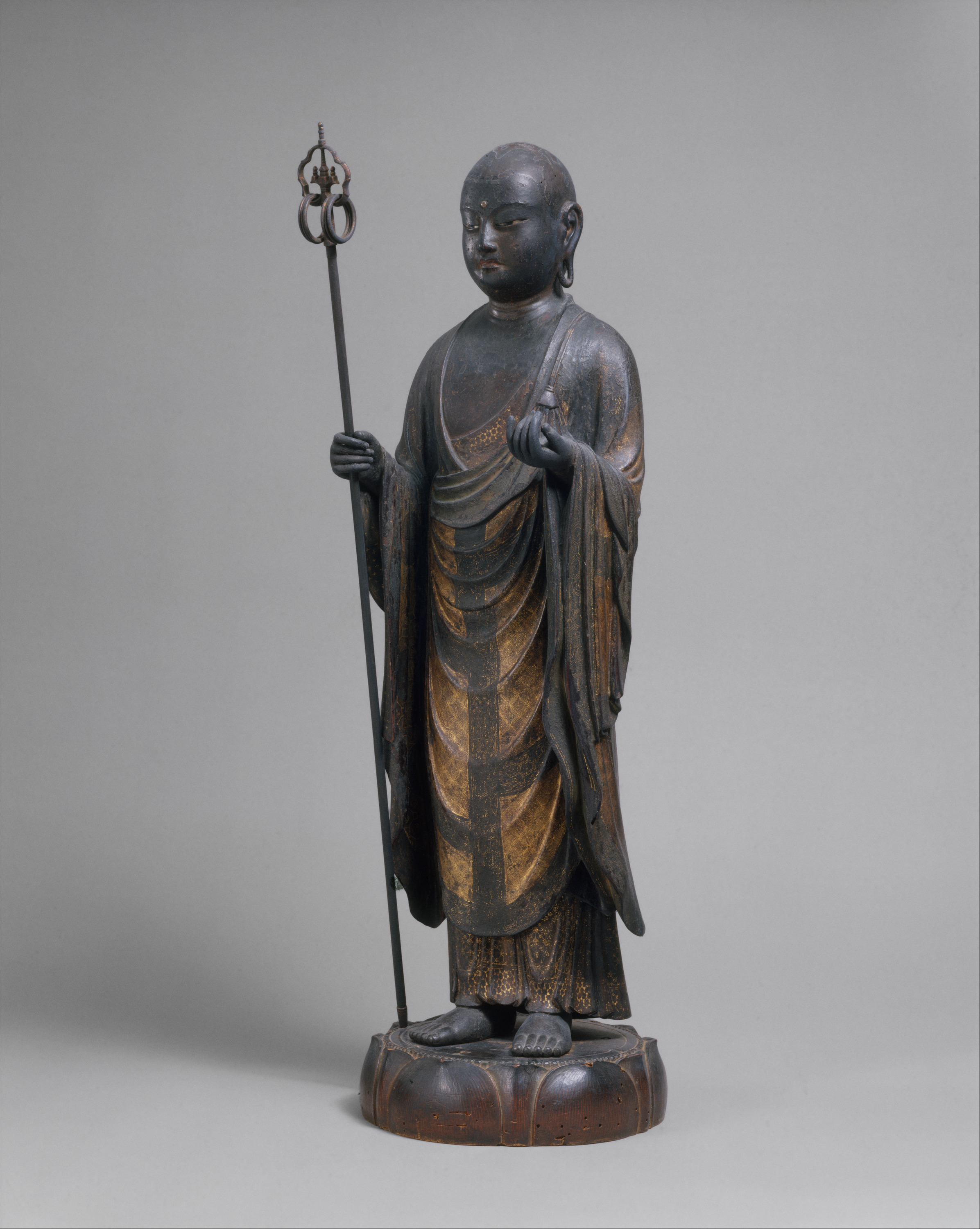
The Burke Jizō, part of same batch of statues, also owned by the MET.

In 1938, the sculpture was sold to auction house Setsu Gatōdō in Tokyo whereupon during a visit to Japan on 8 January 1962, Concert Hall Society founder and art collector Samuel Josefowitz purchased the sculpture.

Initially on long term loan to the Metropolitan Museum of Art from 2012-2022, on 13 October 2023, Josefowitz's collection was put on auction at Christie's in London. For an initial estimate of 2-4 million GBP, it was sold to the MET's permanent collection for 3.67 million GBP (4.57 million USD). It is now catalogued under accession number 2023.640a–c.

== Description ==
The Jizō is constructed of hinoki, assembled in multiple joining blocks, or yosegi zukuri. The interior is hollow, which allows for the insertion of rock crystal eyes. He is depicted as youthful and innocent, head shaved, and long earlobes symbolizing enlightenment, wearing a kasaya, decorated with kirikane and partial polychromy, yielding a khakkhara. The left hand yields a jewel of wisdom, which grants wishes.

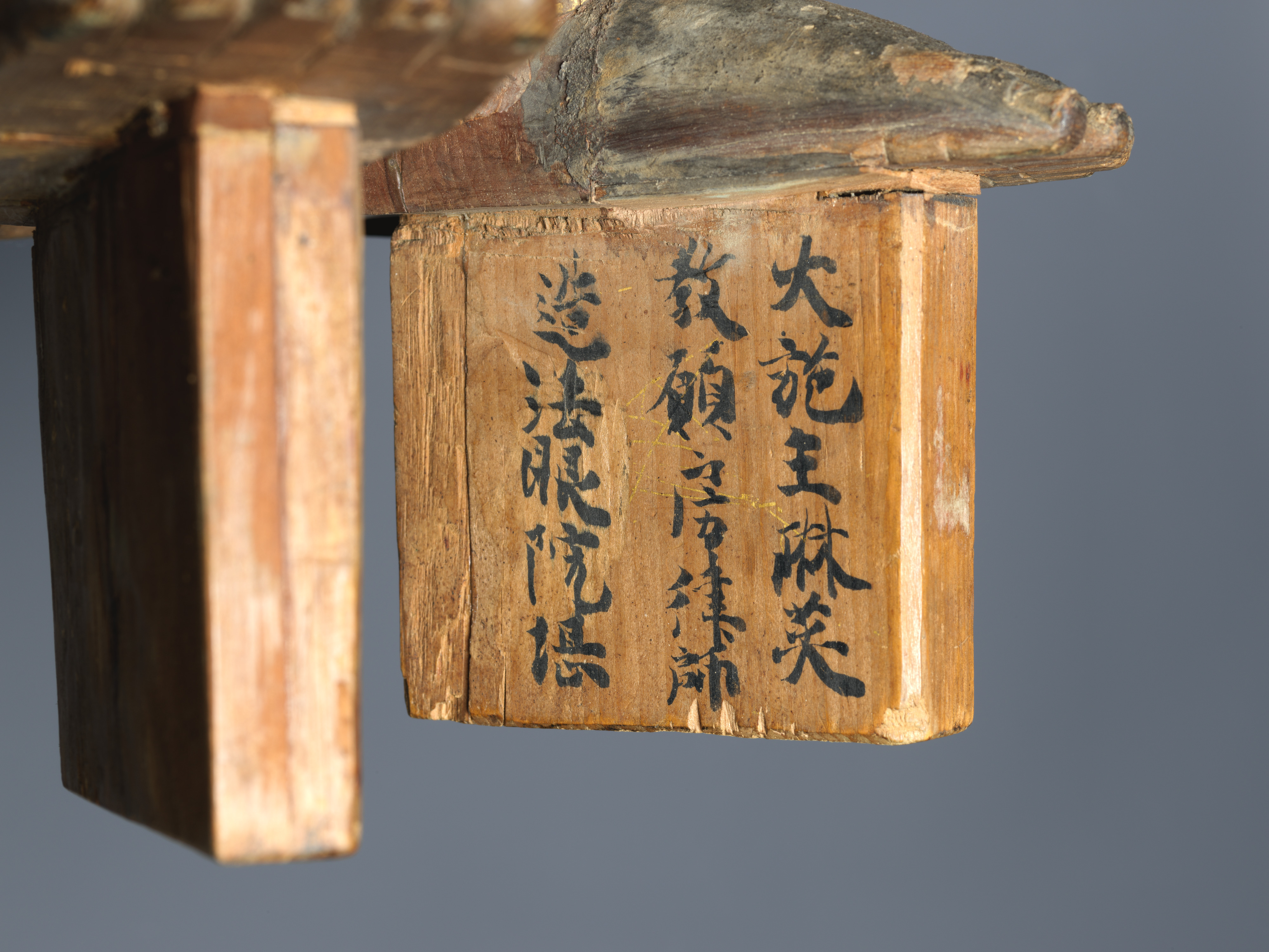
Signature of the artist at the foot joint.

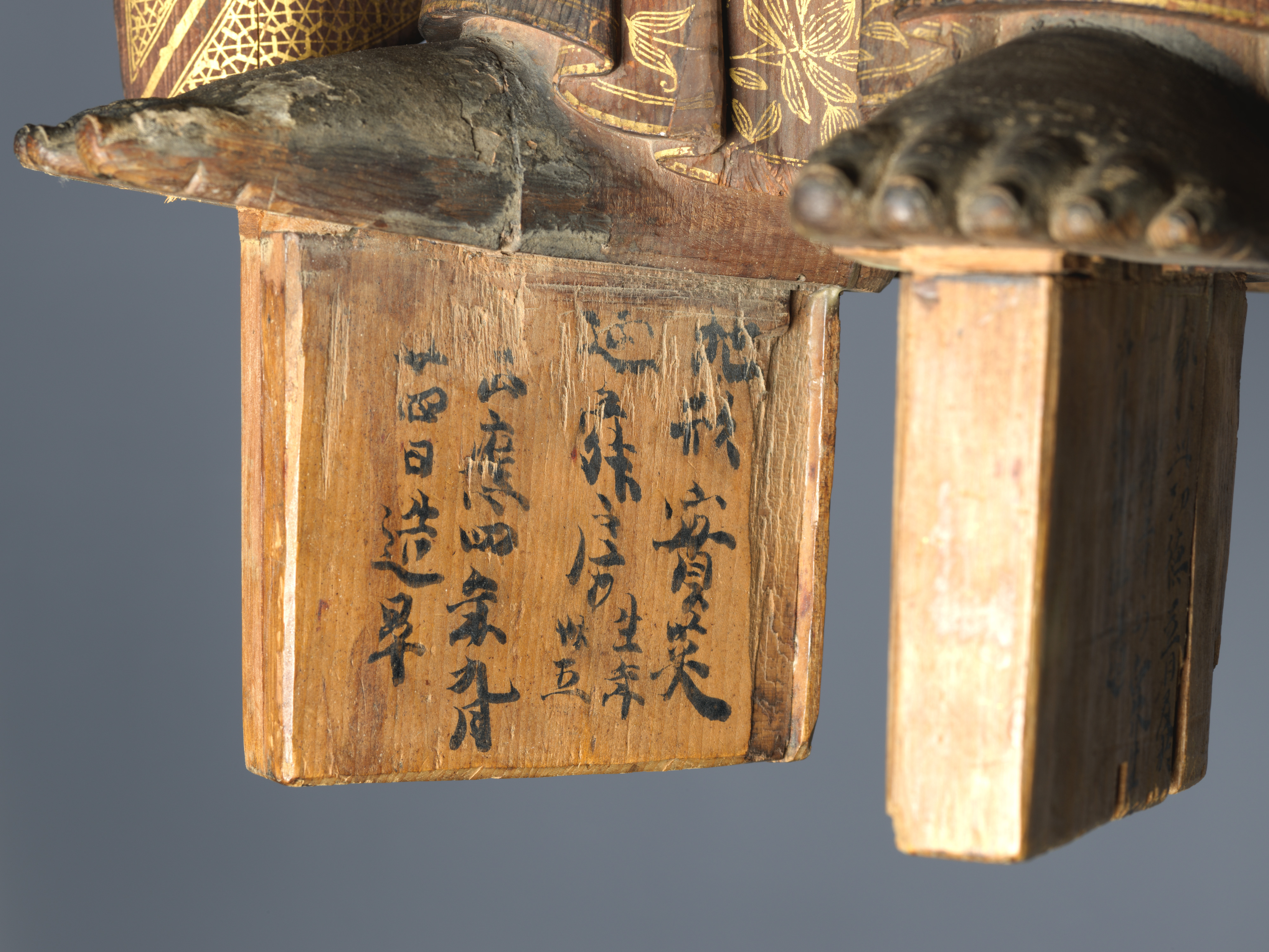
Signature of the artist at the foot joint.

Inpa style of sculptures tend to utilize elegant, gentle features, as shown with the flow of the robes as well as soft expressions, which was in line of the preferred style of the Heian court. And as such the sculpture was made in a time where welcoming deities became popular at the end of the 13th century, to which Jizō became a popular bodhisattva to worship.

At the foot of the statue, in the connecting joint to the lotus pedestal, a written description on the joint has the signature, the date of the sculptor, as well as the commissioning monks "Kyōganbō Daisōzu Rin'ei" and "Jitsu’ei Enshunbō".

Intan's name written as "院湛" utilizes the nomenclature of the Inpa school, as well as that of the sculptor Tankei (湛慶), son of Unkei of the Kei school, which indicates that Intan wanted to name himself as a user of both Inpa and Keiha styles.

In a press release by the MET, the Jizō was hailed as a richly documented piece that strengthens the museum's holdings of Japanese art.
