= Zhao Jianxi Buddhist Stele =

Northern Wei Dynasty stele in the Asian Art Museum, San Fran

- 赵见憘造像碑 (Zhào jiàn xǐ zàoxiàng bēi)
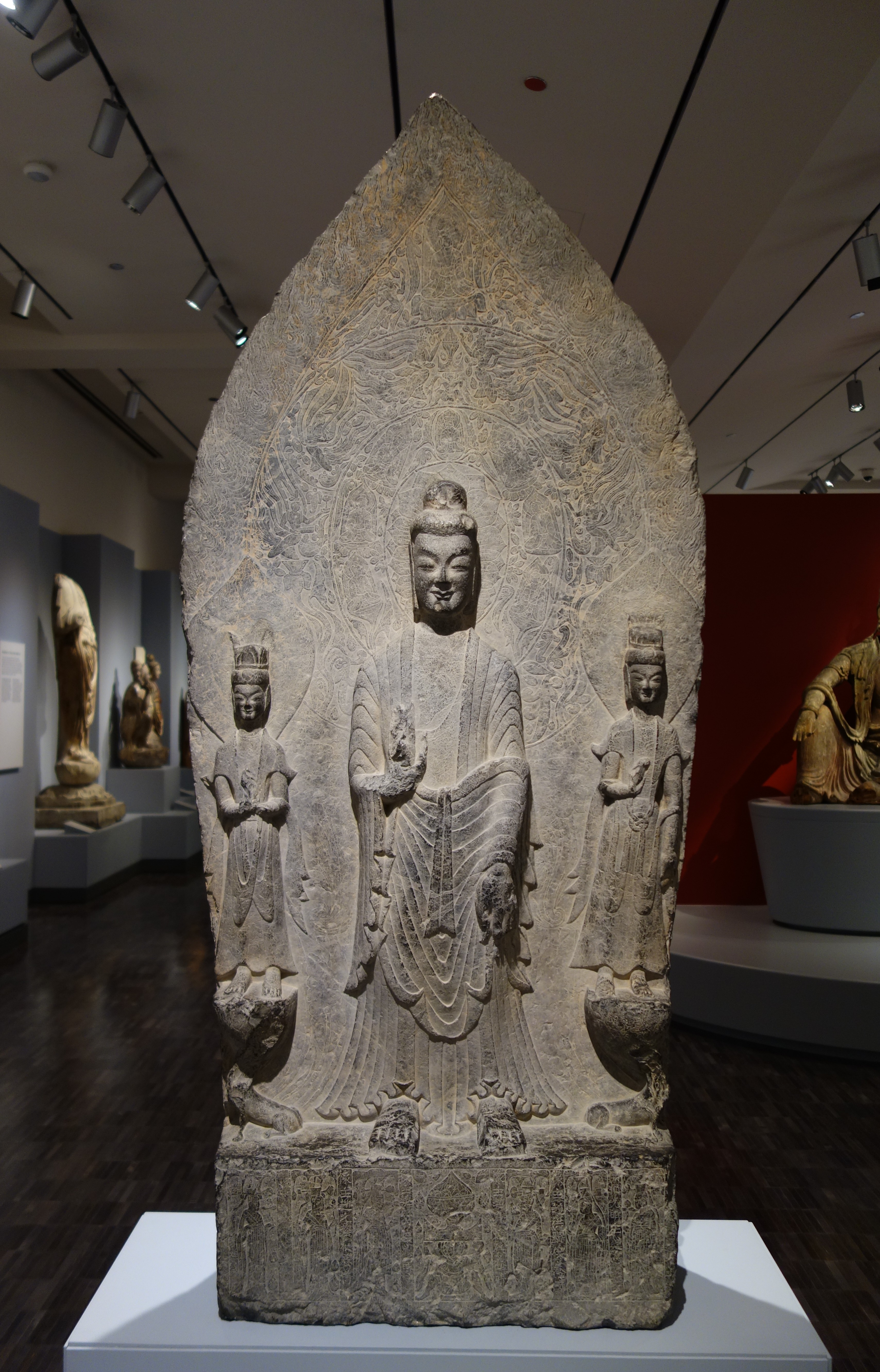

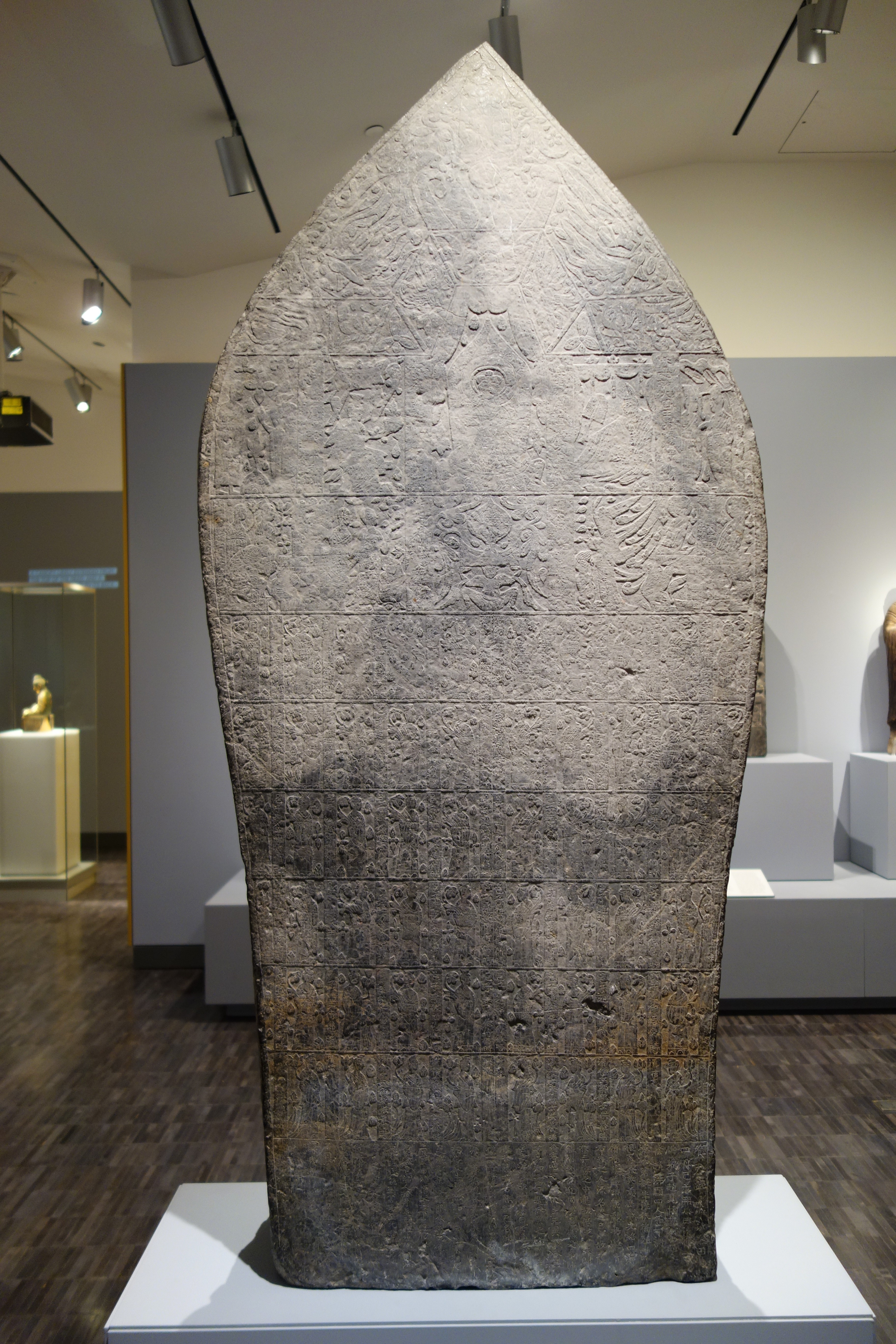
- Material: Limestone
- Length: 25.4 cm (10.0 in)
- Height: 170.2 cm (67.0 in)
- Width: 76.2 cm (30.0 in)
- Created: 533
- Present location: Asian Art Museum (San Francisco)
- Identification: The Avery Brundage Collection: B60S44
- Culture: Northern Wei Dynasty
- https://searchcollection.asianart.org/objects/4896/stele-of-the-buddha-and-two-bodhisattvas?ctx=f7d83d42c407dfca43bc204e2202b31fec46b56e&idx=13

The Zhao Jianxi Buddhist Stele (Chinese: 赵见憘造像碑; Pinyin: Zhào jiàn xǐ zàoxiàng bēi) is a 6th century Buddhist stele from the Northern Wei dynasty in China. It is part of a series of acquisitions made by International Olympic Committee president Avery Brundage, which then became the cornerstone of the collection of the Asian Art Museum in San Francisco, where it is currently displayed under acquisition number B60S44. Consisting of 56 donors, and commissioned by the Zhao family in 533 AD, the stele consists of scenes from the Vimalakirti Sutra, which gained prominence amongst worshipers in China during the Northern Wei, after its translation by Kumārajīva.

== Description ==
The Vimalakirti Sutra, central to Mahayana Buddhism was translated by the monk Kumārajīva in his time in Chang'an (Xi'an) during the 4th-5th centuries. This was followed by additional commentaries by Sengzhao, Daosheng, Daorong, and Sengrui, whose commentaries were considered the foundations to understanding the sutra from the Later Qin period onwards.

The themes of the sutra deal with the theme of Śūnyatā (emptiness), with enlightenment and "emptiness" leading to miracles, as the tales from the sutra delve into ones performed by the bodhisattva Vimalakirti. Much of the tales from the sutras were interpreted by Kumārajīva's students and adherents in the centuries after the translation of the sutra, which shaped the text's and Vimalakirti's identity as a supernatural being who could protect adherents and defeat demons. Later Qin monk Dao'an portrayed the bodhisattva as a heavenly general with the ability to lead 900 trillion bodhissattvas according to his commentary, the Ximo wen (檄魔文).

The imagery of Vimalakitri was adopted by artists Zhang Mo (张墨) and Gu Kaizhi (顾恺之) of the Western Jin and Eastern Jin Dynasties respectively, followed by expansion of surviving depictions at the Yungang Grottoes and the Longmen Grottoes during the 5th centuries.

=== The Stele ===
The depictions of scenes from the sutra became prominent in the medium of stone steles during the 530s during the Northern Wei, with extant specimens in the Osaka City Museum of Fine Arts, and the Metropolitan Museum of Art.

The Zhao Jianxi Stele was erected during the fourth month of the reign of Emperor Xiaowu of Northern Wei (Yongxi), in the year 533 AD. Measuring 170.2 cm x 76.2 cm x 25.4 cm, the limestone stele is rendered with depictions of The Buddha and two bodhisattvas as a triad, in low relief. Both the Buddha and the right bodhisattva has their hands rendered with the abhayamudra. In typical Northern Wei fashion, the figures have the archaic smile, to symbolize spiritual attainment and benevolence.

All three figures have flame shaped mandorlas, and while the bodhisattvas' are simpler, the Buddha's is elaborate, with apsaras encircling him within the flowering tendrils and patterns of flames. The mandorla is split into five sections: the section by the Buddha's head depicts lotus petals, followed by seven previous Buddhas, and below the apsaras, are dwarven spirits holding censers. The base of the stele has six donors, two groups of three facing the center, each ornately dressed accompanied by an earth spirit with an incense burner. Flanking the scenes next to the donor is the monk Śāriputra and an unidentified disciple. There are 56 donor names, many tied to the Zhao family, and the Buddhist clergy. The inscription identifies Zhao Jianxi, Zhao Wenyin, Zhao Hongxian and an unknown Zhao family member as the lay devotees dedicating the stone to their grandfather, with the stele being simultaneously an offering as well as a gesture for enlightenment.

The backside of the stele depicts the miracles and scenes depicted in the chapters of the Vimalakitri Sutra and the commentaries, such as the Buddha purifying impure land (Chapter 1 of the Commentaries), bodhisattvas sitting on lion seats in differently (Chapter 6), a meal in the Fragrance Lands (Chapter 16), and a Goddess scattering flowers (Chapter 12).

The stele blends the Vimalakitri Sutra with local beliefs common during the Northern Wei, with Buddhist imagery accompanied by heavenly birds and dancers associated with Taoism and ancestral worship.
