= Burke Jizō =

Statue of Jizo by Kaikei (1203)

Jizō, Bodhisattva of the Earth Store (Kshitigarbha)
- Japanese: 快慶作 地蔵菩薩立像
- Artist: Kaikei
- Year: 1202
- Medium: Lacquered Japanese cypress, color, gold, cut gold, and inlaid crystal
- Movement: Kei school
- Dimensions: 55.9 cm × 17.1 cm × 17.1 cm (22 in × 6.75 in × 6.75 in)
- Location: Metropolitan Museum of Art, New York City
- Accession: 2015.300.250a, b
- Website: https://www.metmuseum.org/art/collection/search/53175

The Burke Jizō is a 13th century wooden statue of the bodhisattva Kṣitigarbha, carved in the around 1202 by the sculptor Kaikei. Originally held at Kōfuku-ji, it was held in private collections for many years, including that of American collector Mary Griggs Burke (1916–2012), whereupon in 2015, her collection was bequeathed to the Metropolitan Museum of Art among which includes this statue.

== Background ==
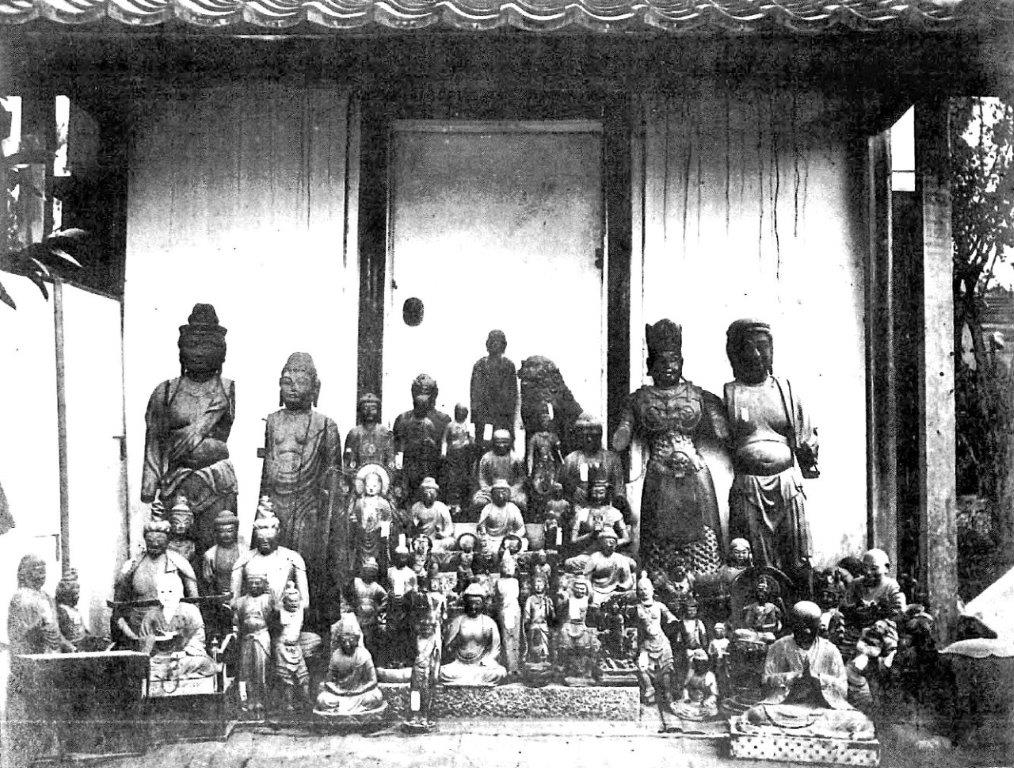
A set of statues from Kofuku-ji various states of conditions in 1901. The Burke Jizo is displayed in the middle, Seated Rāgarāja (Nara National Museum) on the right.

In 1180, during the Genpei War, the Siege of Nara goaded by the Taira clan caused the destruction of the city and its principal temples, Tōdai-ji and Kōfuku-ji. In the decades after the war, construction spurred, helmed by the Kei school, a studio dedicated towards Buddhist sculpture.

Prominent members of the school includes Kōkei, his son Unkei, and Kaikei, who would later commission his first attributable work, the Boston Miroku in 1189 to Kōfuku-ji, whereupon he would spend years carving the pantheon to restore the Nara temples to their former glory.

In 1906, the Jizō was de-accessioned by Kōfuku-ji as the temple needed funds due to neglect, a fallout of the Meiji Restoration policy of shinbutsu bunri and haibutsu kishaku.

In April 1970, type designer Jackson Burke and his wife, Mary, acquired the statue at the Galerie Janette Ostier, Paris. The Burke Collection would then become the largest collection of Japanese art outside of Japan, and as such the statue would be displayed on special exhibits from 1985 onwards. Upon the passing of Mary Griggs Burke in 2012, the collection including the Burke Jizō has since then become a part of the Metropolitan Museum of Art's permanent collection.

In 2017, the statue was displayed at the Nara National Museum as part of a retrospective exhibit on Kaikei's work.

== Description ==
Inlaid gold patterning of the robes of the statue.

The statue, carved from hinoki, is joined with a technique known as yosegi-zukuri (or multiple blocks), with a hollow interior, where the crystal eyes are inlaid. The Burke Jizō utilizes a signature style of Kaikei, which is that of a naturalistic model of the body, along with cut-gold patterning of the robes (kirikane). His right hand would hold a staff, the khakkhara and a jewel on the left hand (hōju no tama).

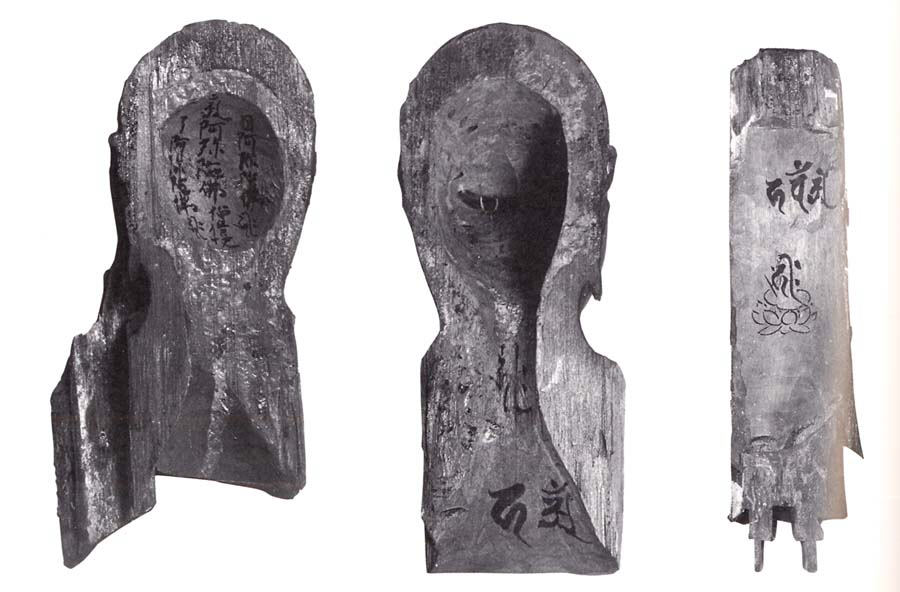
The interior of the Jizo statue, marked with Kaikei's signature

While the Boston Miroku carved in 1189, represented the first phase of Kaikei's style, from 1192 to 1209 marked the second phase of his art career, in which he adopted the "An Ami" style, named after his signature "Kōshō An Amida Butsu" (Craftsman An Amida Buddha).

This style was reflected on the Jizō, involving naturalism as well as linear and simplified decorations, heavily influenced by Song dynasty art, thanks to the abbot of Tōdai-ji, Chōgen. The abbot's visits to China inspired him to remodel Nara's temples from what was contemporary at the time.

== See also ==
- Statue of Jizō (Intan) - another statue of Jizō in the MET, also from Kōfuku-ji
