= Asian Art Museum (San Francisco) =

Museum in San Francisco, California, U.S.

Asian Art Museum of San Francisco – Chong-Moon Lee Center for Asian Art and Culture

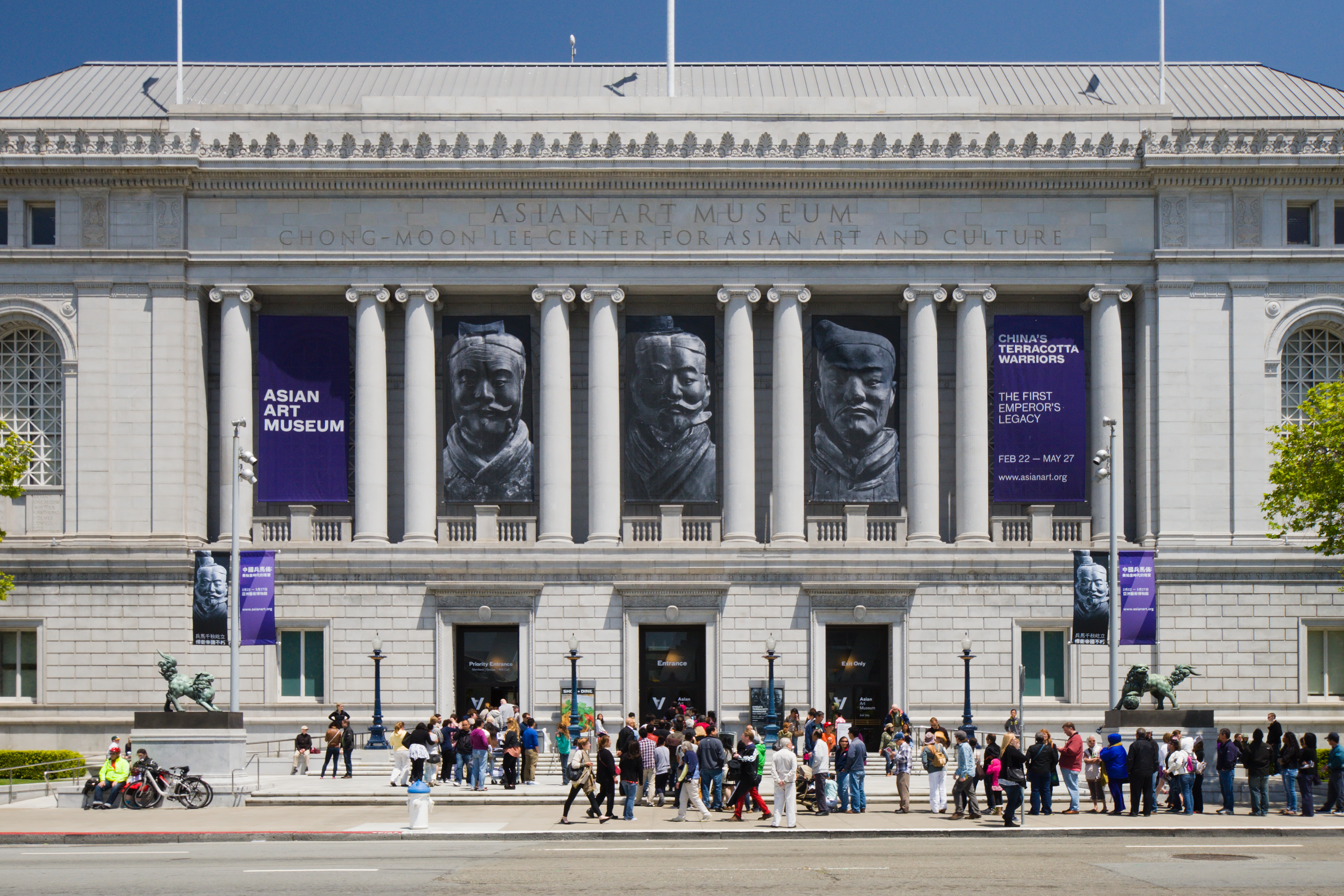

- Location within San Francisco County
- Established: 1966
- Coordinates: 37.780276°N 122.416577°W
- Type: Asian and Asian American art
- Director: Soyoung Lee (2025–present)
- Architects: Building (1917): George Kelham; Museum interior (2003): Gae Aulenti
- Website: www.asianart.org
- Area: 200,000-square-foot (19,000 m^{2})

The Asian Art Museum of San Francisco – Chong-Moon Lee Center for Asian Art and Culture is a museum in San Francisco, California, that specializes in Asian art. The museum building and its permanent collection are owned by the City of San Francisco.

== Collection ==
The Asian Art Museum is home to one of the largest and most extensive permanent collections of Asian art in the world, representing all major Asian countries and traditions and the global Asian diaspora. The collection contains more than 20,000 objects, some of which are as much as 6,000 years old. Galleries devoted to the arts of South Asia, Iran and Central Asia, Southeast Asia, the Himalayas, China, Korea, and Japan feature a regularly rotating display of more than 2,000 objects from the collection.

== Leadership ==
Soyoung Lee is The Barbara Bass Bakar Director and CEO of the Asian Art Museum. In January 2019, Abby Chen was appointed as the Head of Contemporary Art.

== History ==
=== Founding ===
The museum originated from a donation to the City of San Francisco by Chicago millionaire Avery Brundage, a major collector of Asian art. The Society for Asian Art, incorporated in 1958, was formed to secure Brundage's collection for the city. San Francisco voters passed a $2.75 million bond for the construction of a new wing of the M. H. de Young Memorial Museum in Golden Gate Park to house the museum, which opened in 1966. Brundage continued to make donations to the museum, including the bequest of all his remaining personal collection of Asian art on his death in 1975. In total, Brundage donated more than 7,700 Asian art objects to San Francisco.

=== Relocation ===
As the museum's collection grew, the facilities in Golden Gate Park were no longer sufficient to display or even house the collection. In 1987, Mayor Dianne Feinstein proposed a plan to revitalize Civic Center that included relocating the museum to the Main Library. In 1995, Silicon Valley entrepreneur Chong-Moon Lee made a $15 million donation to launch the funding campaign for a new building for the museum.

During its last year in the park, the museum was closed for the purpose of moving to its new location opposite the San Francisco Civic Center. Formerly the main San Francisco city library, this Beaux-Arts building designed by George Kelham in 1917 is one of the city’s most important historic structures. It was renovated under the direction of Italian architect Gae Aulenti, including a seismic upgrade scheme to the building involving base isolation, and reopened on March 20, 2003.

=== 2011 Mission Shift ===
In October 2011, three years after the appointment of Jay Xu as director, the museum expanded its mission to include:

- Increasing the visibility of Asian American artists;
- Collecting and exhibiting contemporary art; and
- Providing a platform for cultural regions of Asia that have been historically underrepresented in museums.

This shift in direction was accompanied by a new logo. Designed by the branding agency Wolff Olins, the logo is an upside-down 'A,' representing the idea of approaching Asian art from a new perspective; in the context of mathematics, it is a symbol meaning "for all."

=== Contemporary Art ===
Large-scale exhibitions of contemporary art at the Asian Art Museum since 2011 include:

- 28 Chinese (2015)
- First Look: Collecting Contemporary at the Asian (2015)
- Kimono Refashioned (2019)
- teamLab: Continuity (2021–2022)
- Carlos Villa: Worlds in Collision (2022)
- Takashi Murakami: Unfamiliar People—Swelling of Monsterized Human Ego (2023–2024)
- Hallyu! The Korean Wave (2024–2025)

=== Reckoning with founder's legacy ===
Despite founder Avery Brundage's professed goal of creating a "bridge of understanding" between the U.S. and Asia, a deeper inquiry revealed that he held racist, sexist, and antisemitic beliefs that entirely contradicted the mission and values of the museum. In June 2020, museum director Jay Xu wrote in an open letter to the public that "We must contend with the very history of how our museum came to be," acknowledging that Brundage "espoused racist and anti-Semitic views" and that the museum must respond to "a society structured around white supremacy." The same year, the museum removed a statue of Brundage from the lobby where it had stood for five decades and launched a thorough re-examination of his controversial legacy.

=== Expansion ===
In March 2016, the museum announced an expansion project adding more than 15,000 square feet across two levels, including a new 8,500-square-foot pavilion intended to accommodate large works of contemporary art; a 7,200-square-foot rooftop sculpture garden; and the Koret Education Center, a multifunctional classroom for educational and public programming.

The Akiko Yamazaki and Jerry Yang Pavilion opened in July 2023 with an inaugural exhibition by Japanese art collective TeamLab. The East West Bank Art Terrace opened in August 2023; it is the newest and largest rooftop art venue in San Francisco.

=== The Heart of Zen ===
In 2023, the Asian Art Museum presented The Heart of Zen, an exhibition featuring Six Persimmons, a famed 13th-century Chinese ink painting "hailed as an illustration of Zen Buddhism's greatest teachings" and designated an Important Cultural Property by the Japanese government. This exhibition marked the first time Six Persimmons had ever been displayed outside of Japan. The New York Times reported that "an 800-year-old ink painting, regarded as the “Zen Mona Lisa,” has made a once-in-a-lifetime trip to the United States."

=== Accolades and Honors ===
The Asian Art Museum has received accreditation from the American Alliance of Museums' Museum Assessment Program, a peer-based validation of an institution’s operations and impact.

In 2017, the museum's 2016–2017 exhibition The Rama Epic: Hero, Heroine, Ally, Foe was the recipient of three major museum industry awards: a Special Achievement Award for Interpretation in the Excellence in Exhibition from the Association of Art Museums; an Award for Excellence from the Association of Art Museum Curators & AAMC Foundation for the exhibition catalog; and a Bronze MUSE Award for Audio Tours and Podcasts.

To promote its 2017 exhibition Flower Power, the museum assembled a crowd of 2,405 people to form the shape of a lotus flower, setting a new Guinness World Record for "largest human flower."

The museum was awarded the Japanese Foreign Minister’s Commendation for their contributions to promotion of cultural exchange through art between Japan and the United States on December 1, 2020.

In 2024, curator Abby Chen received the Distinguished Art Educator Award from the National Art Education Association's Asian Art and Culture Interest Group.

== Collection highlights ==
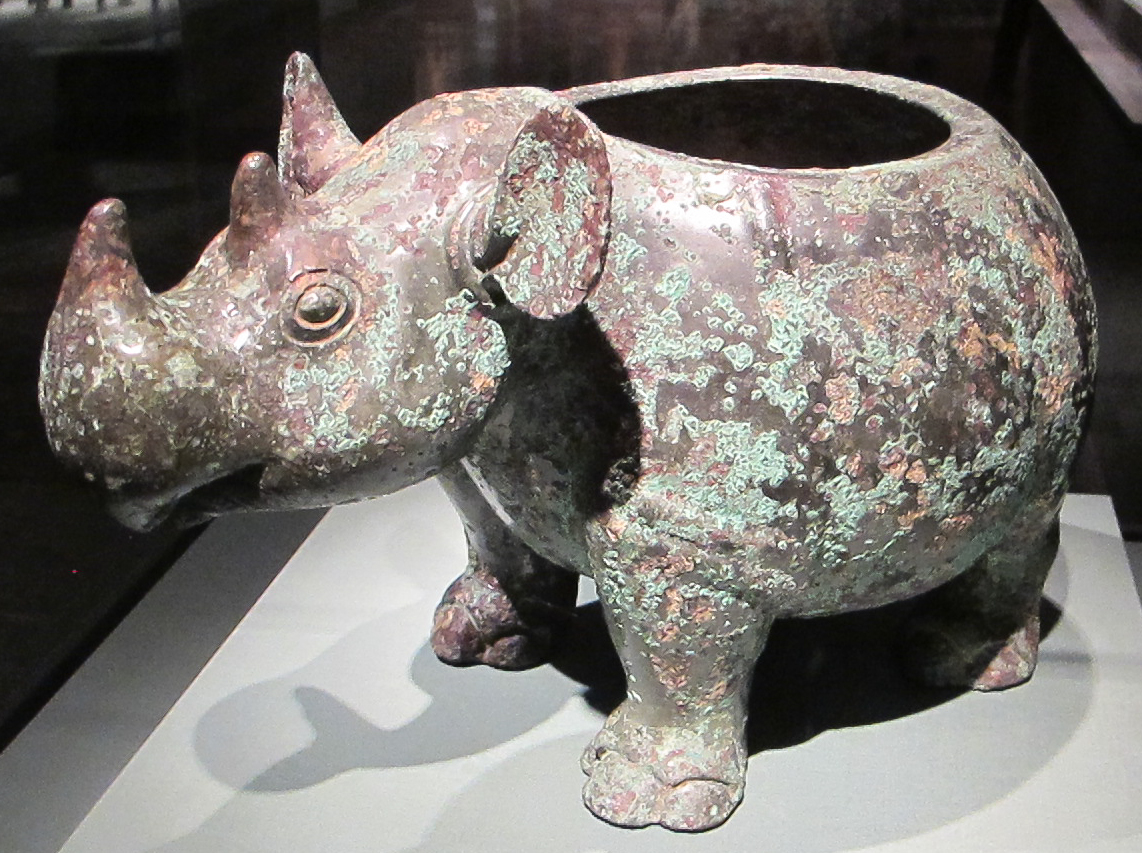
Bronze zun in the shape of a rhinoceros. Shang dynasty, c.1100-1050 BCE

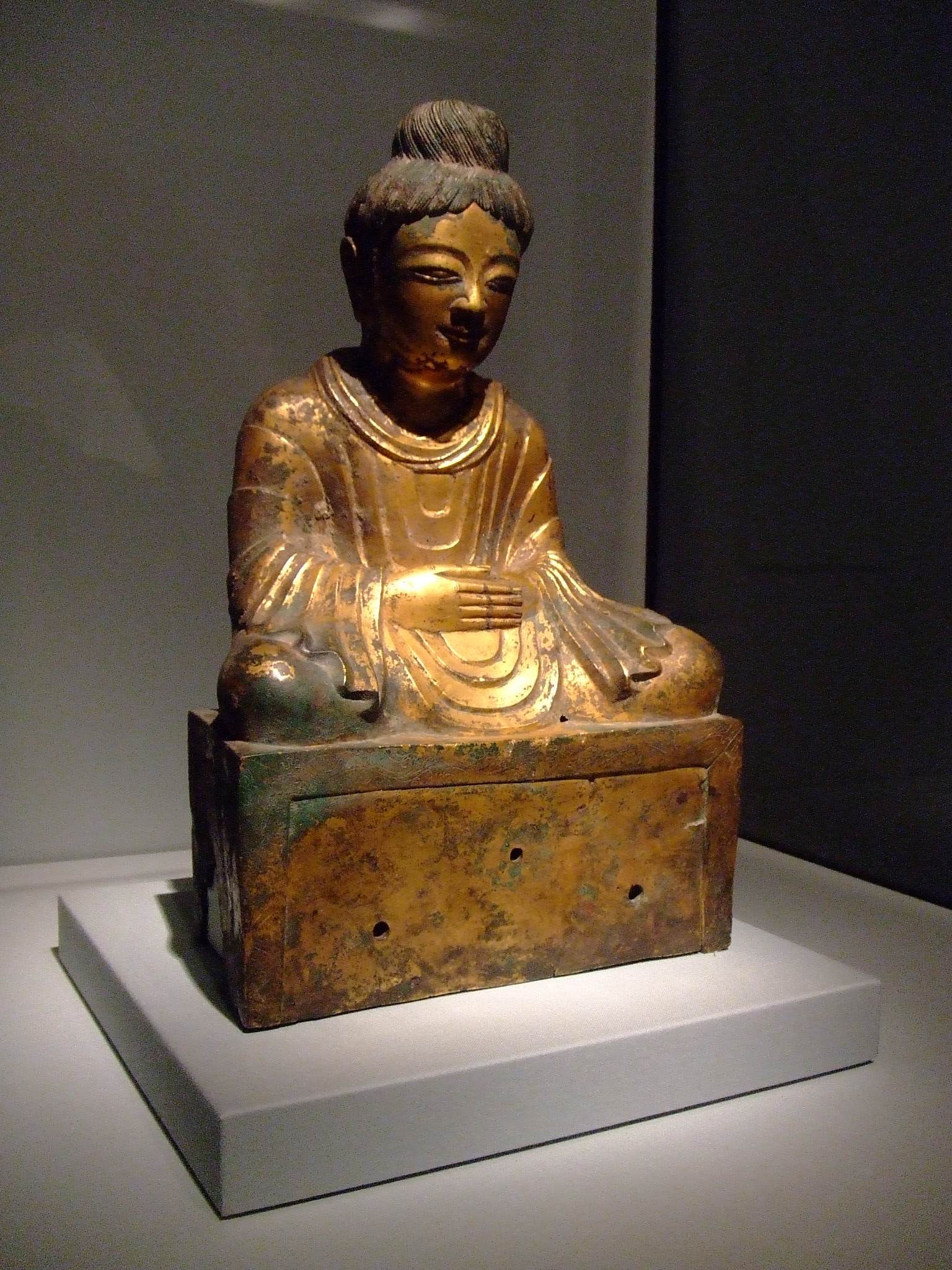
Buddha dated 338, the earliest known dated Buddha sculpture produced in China

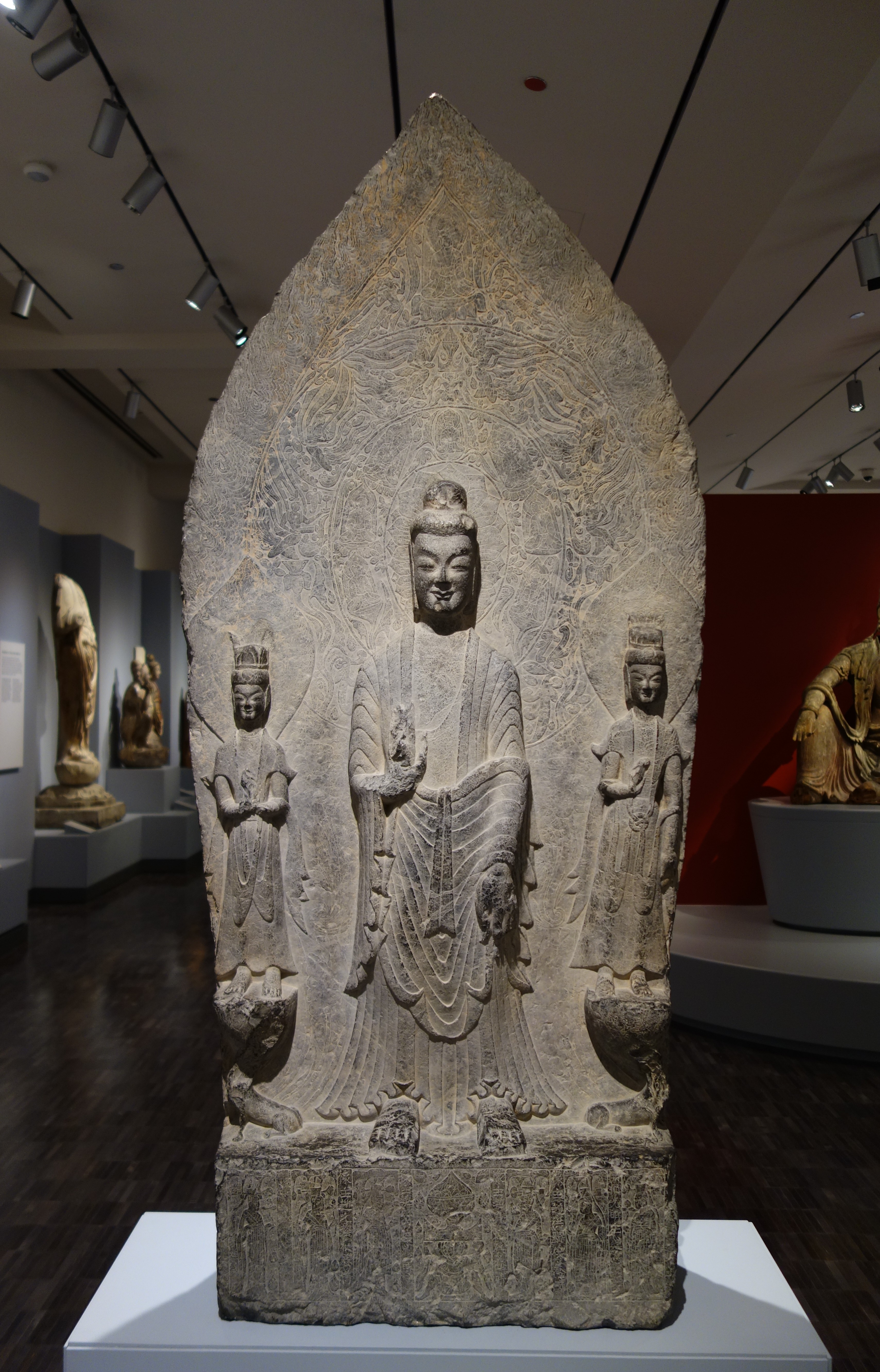
Zhao Jianxi Buddhist Stele, 533

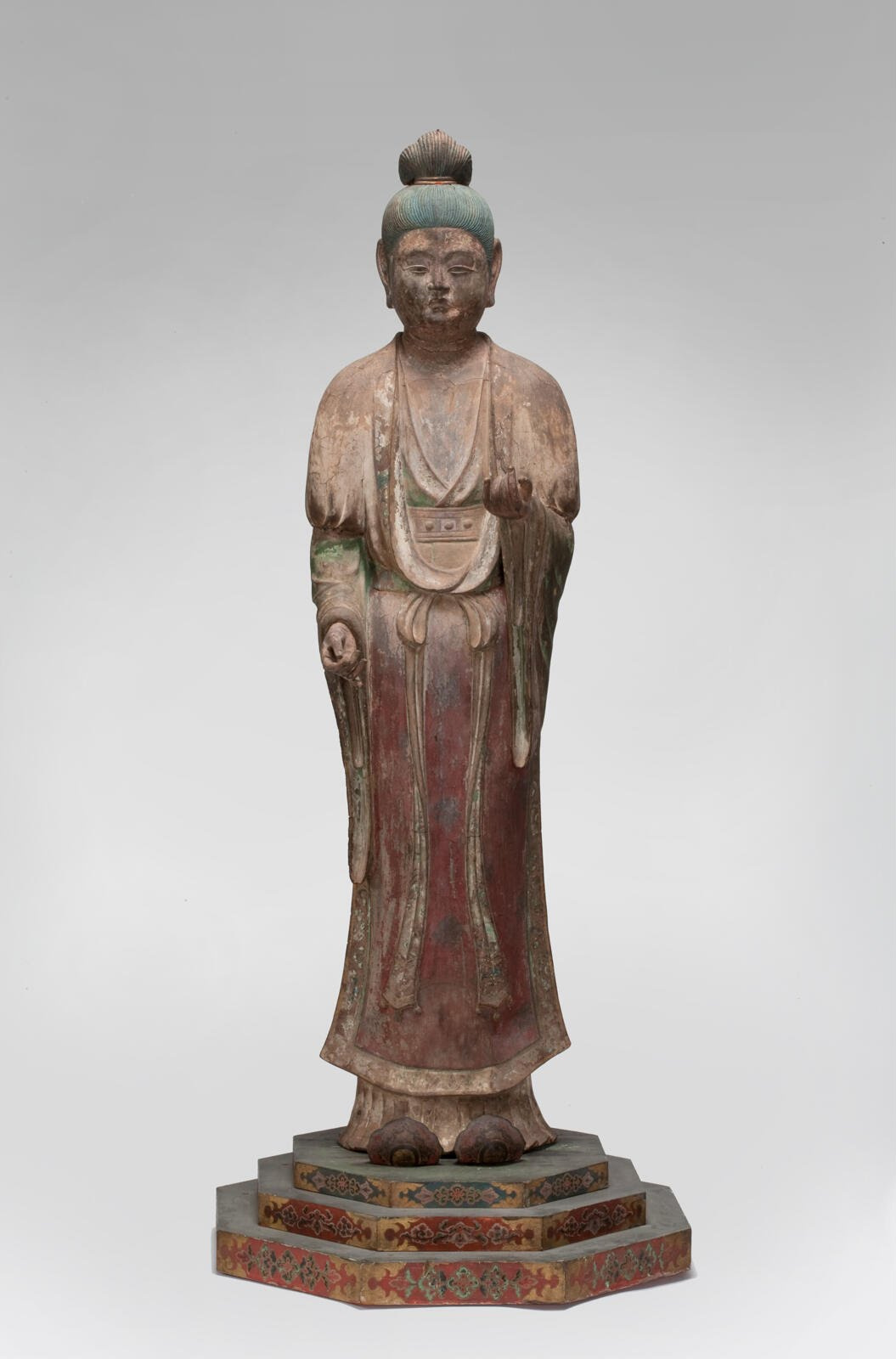
The deity Brahma (Bonten), one of a pair. Nara, c. 730-750

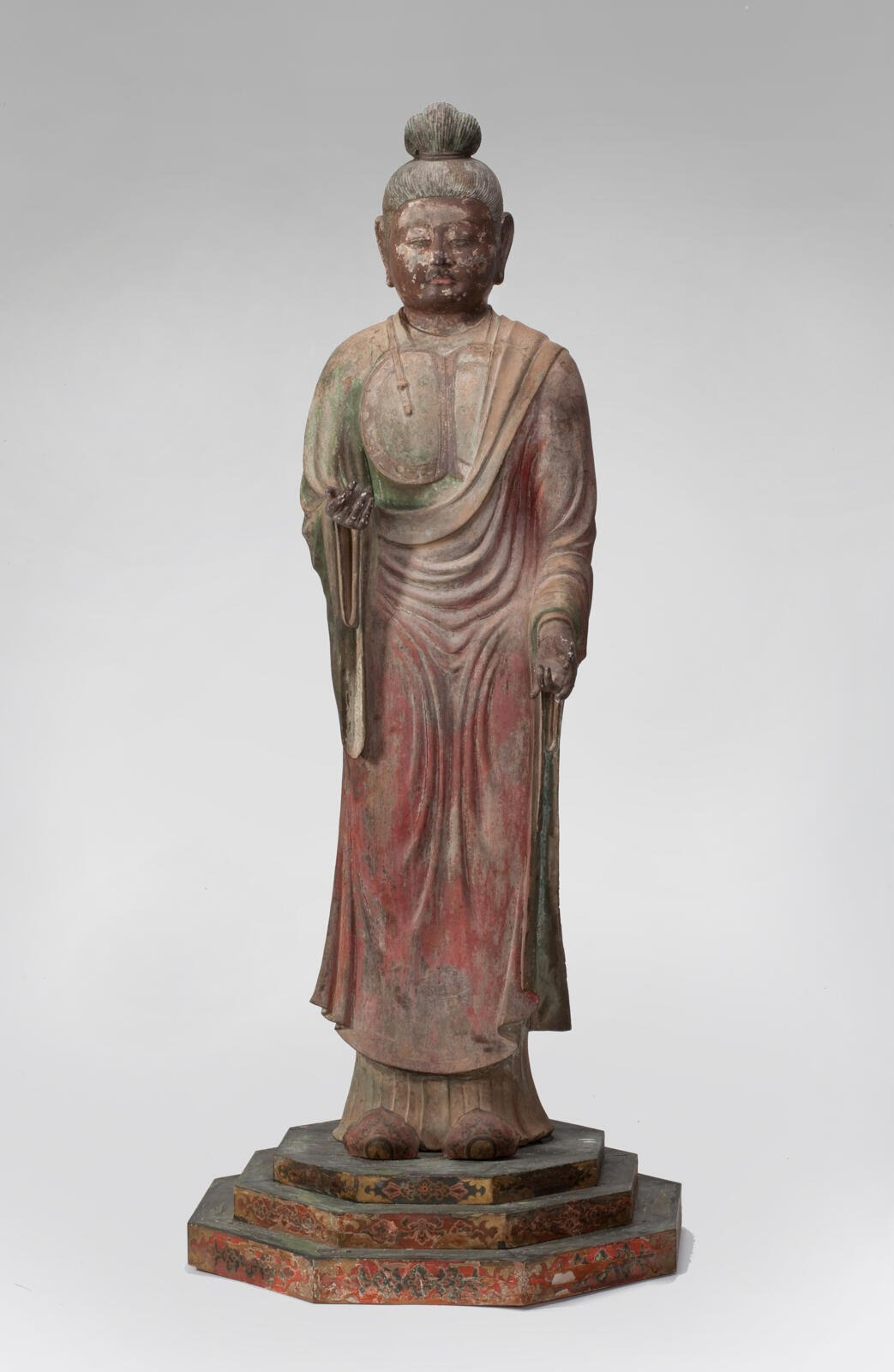
The deity Indra (Taishakuten), one of a pair. Nara, c. 730-750

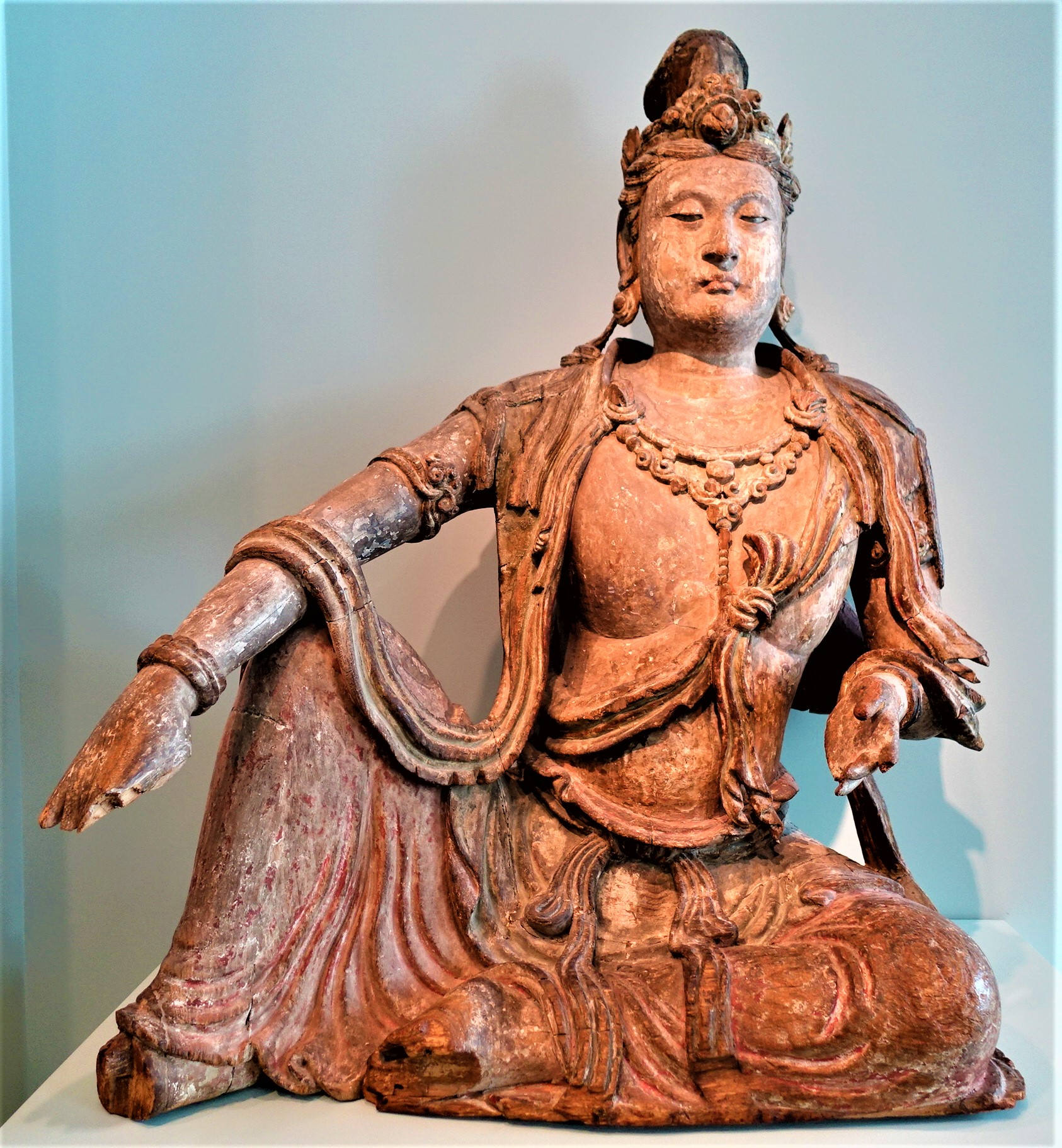
The bodhisattva Avalokiteshvara (Guanyin). Song dynasty, 12th century

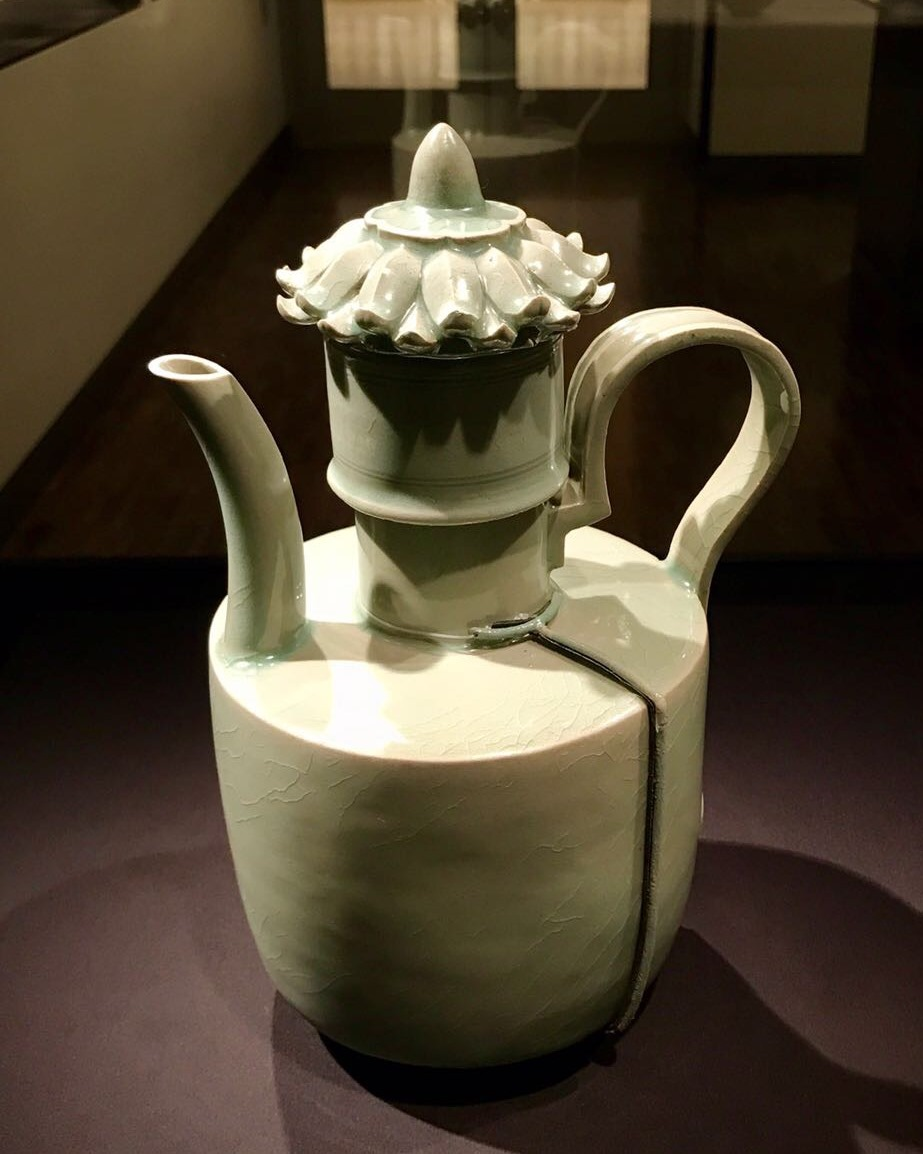
Ewer with lotus-shaped lid. Goryeo, c. 1050-1150

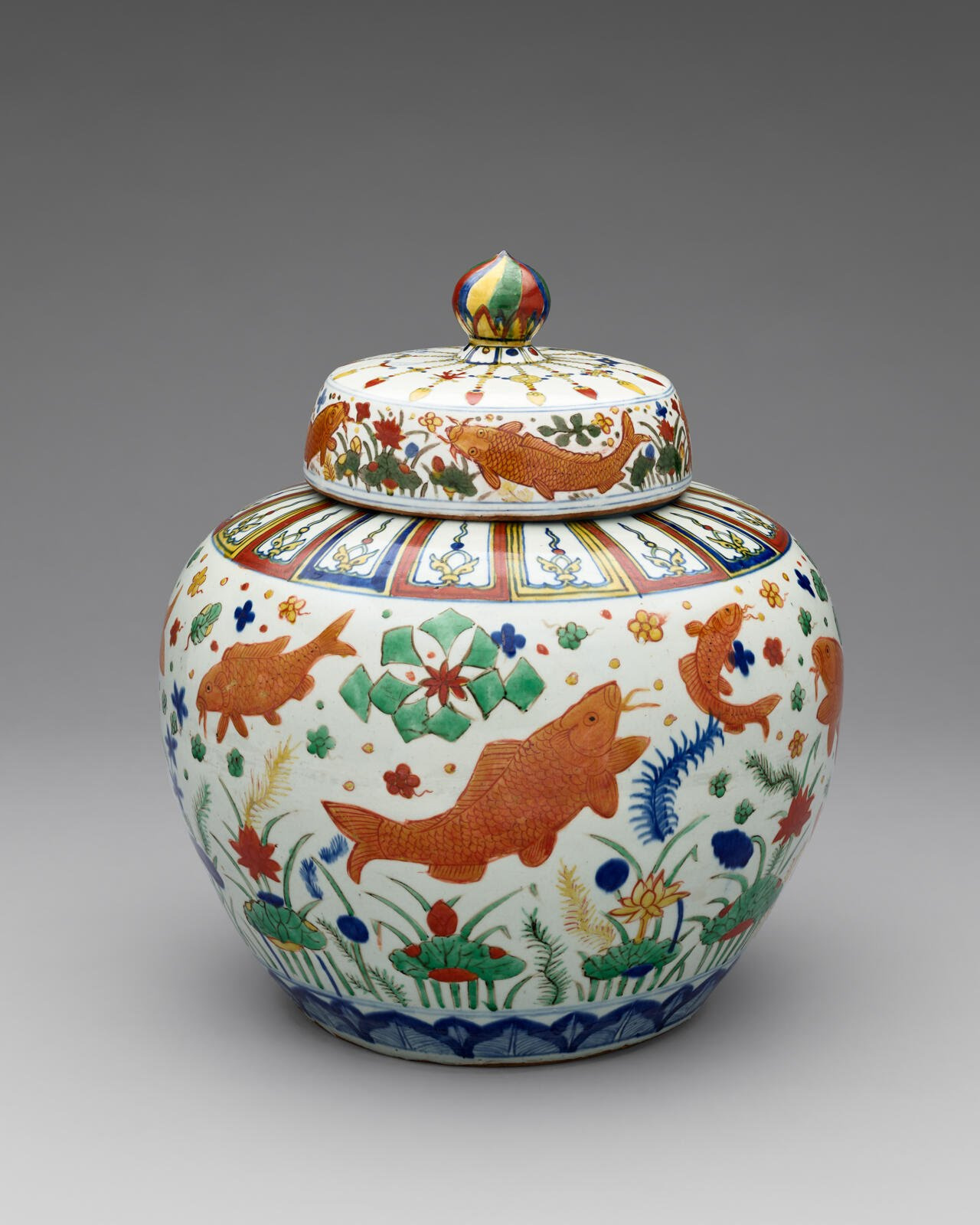
Lidded jar with design of a lotus pond. Jingdezhen, Wucai style, between 1522 and 1566

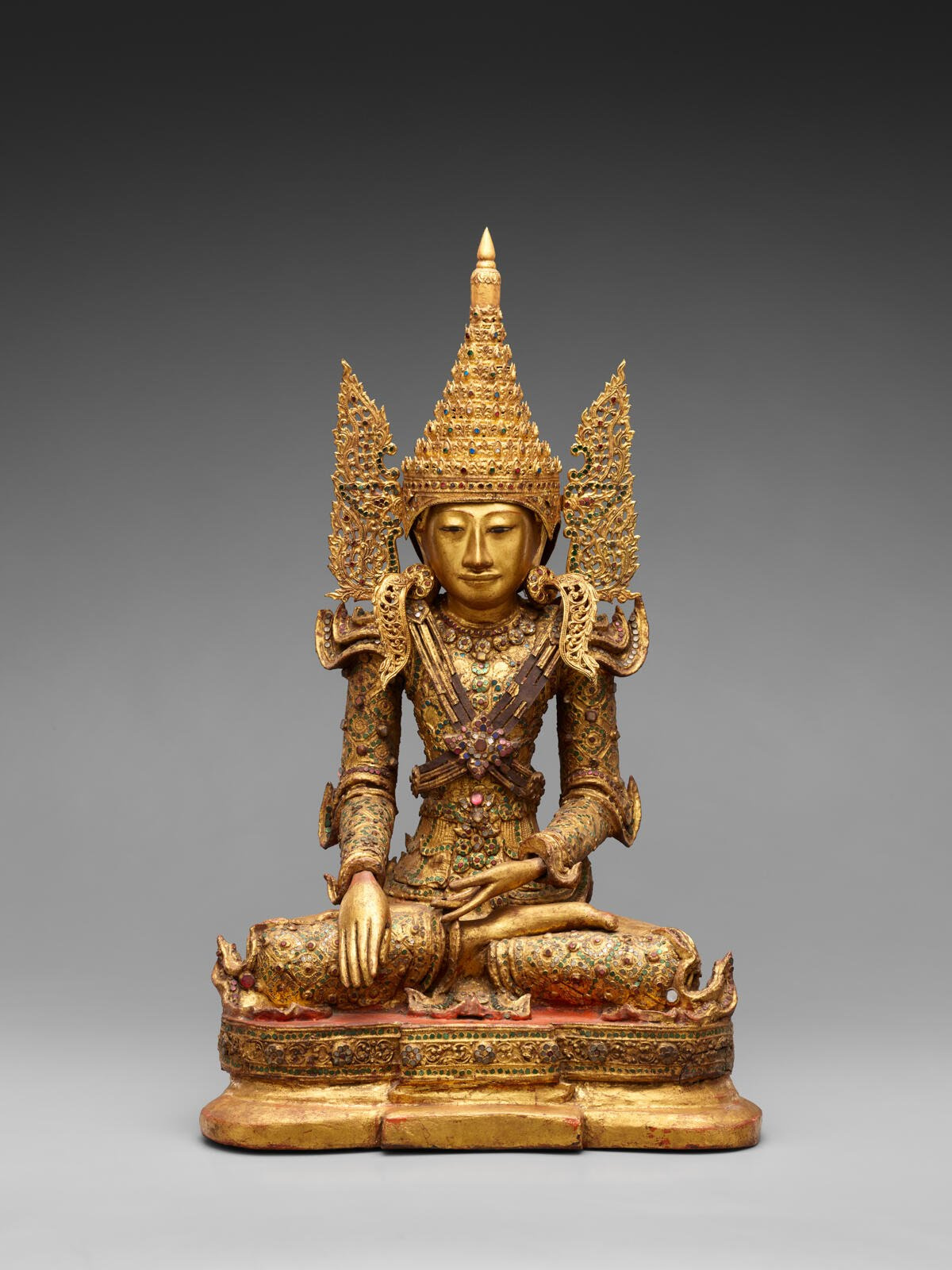
Crowned and bejeweled Buddha image. Mandalay Region, c. 1860-1880

== Tea House ==
A Japanese tea house is displayed on the second exhibition floor of the museum. This teahouse was built in Kyoto, disassembled, shipped to San Francisco and reconstructed in the museum by Japanese carpenters. The name of the tea house can be seen on a wooden plaque "In the Mist" located next to the Tea House on the second floor of the museum, The calligraphy on this wooden plaque is based on the calligraphy by Yamada Sobin and commissioned by Yoshiko Kakudo, the museum's first curator of Japanese art. The Tea House was designed by architect Osamu Sato as a functioning teahouse, as well as a display case. It is complete with an alcove for the display of a scroll and flowers, an electric-powered sunken hearth used in winter for the hot water kettle, and a functioning preparation area (mizuya) with fresh running water and drain.

== See also ==
- 49-Mile Scenic Drive
- List of museums with major collections of Asian art
