= Masuda Takashi =

Japanese industrialist (1848–1938)

- 益田 孝
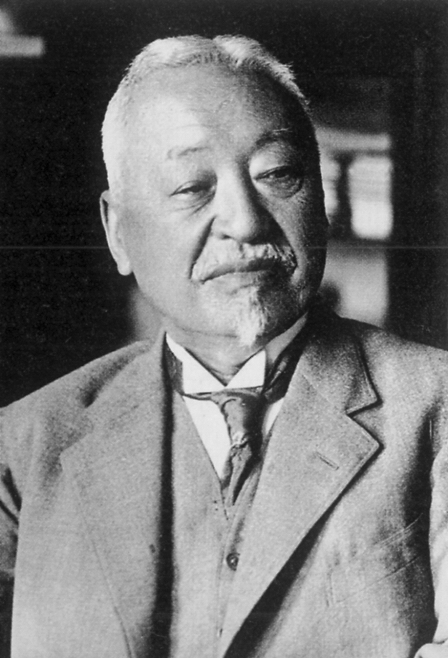
- Masuda Takashi
- Born: November 12, 1848; Sado Island, Niigata Prefecture, Japan
- Died: December 28, 1938 (aged 90)
- Occupations: Founder of Mitsui Bussan and Nihon Keizai Shimbun

Baron Masuda Takashi (益田 孝; November 12, 1848 – December 28, 1938) was a Japanese industrialist, investor, and art collector. He was a prominent entrepreneur in Meiji, Taishō and early Shōwa period Japan, responsible for transforming Mitsui into a zaibatsu through the creation of a general trading company, Mitsui & Co. He also established a newspaper, the Chugai Shōgyō Shimpō (中外商業新報), which was later renamed the Nihon Keizai Shimbun.

== Biography ==
Masuda was born on Sado Island, in what is now Niigata Prefecture.

His father was an official in the Tokugawa shogunate, serving as Hakodate bugyō. Masuda's ancestors have been—for generations—employed at Sado Magistrate's Office. Masuda's father became Hakodate bugyō, serving as a representative of the central government to the regional magistrate office. His position involved dealing with foreigners and foreign trade as the sakoku national isolation policy ended in the Bakumatsu period. During this period, the American Consulate General Townsend Harris was based at Zenpuku-ji in Azabu. Takashi served as an interpreter there at the age of 14.

Masuda accompanied Ikeda Nagaoki in the unsuccessful 1863 Second Japanese Embassy to Europe to negotiate the cancellation of the open-port status of Yokohama. He was inspired by Western culture so, upon his return home, he studied English at the Hepburn School (the forerunner of Meiji Gakuin University).

In 1871, after the Meiji restoration, Masuda obtained a job at the Ministry of Finance through his personal connections with Inoue Kaoru. Masuda's younger sister, Nagai Shigeko, accompanied Tsuda Ume to the United States in November 1871, and along with Tsuda, would devoted her life to furthering education for women in Japan.

He later served as Master of the Mint, but resigned in 1873. In 1874, Masuda established as vice president the Senshu Kaisha trading company in Tokyo with Inoue's support. In 1876, at the age of 29, Masuda was appointed the president of Mitsui Trading Company (Mitsui Bussan Kaisha) and contributed to the development of the Mitsui zaibatsu. Mitsui quickly became a dominant player in Japanese exports of silk cloth and thread, cotton, coal, and rice, and in the import of industrial products and weaponry.

Masuda negotiated with the Ministry of Industry to acquire ownership of the Miike coal mines at very favorable prices when the government decided to divest itself of industries. This became the subsidiary company, Mitsui Mining Company, in 1889, with Dan Takuma as president. This company became the core of the producing sector of the Mitsui Trading Company as well as its expansion in the 1890s in the machinery, textile, and paper industries.

In 1900, Masuda created the Taiwan Sugar Corporation, beginning Mitsui's expansion into Japanese overseas colonies. By the 1910s, Mitsui had developed into Japan's largest general trading company, accounting for nearly 20% of Japan's total trade.

Masuda formally retired in 1913, and devoted his energies towards the Japanese tea ceremony. He had residences in Odawara and Kamakura, where he hosted tea ceremonies. He founded one of the two most prestigious annual chakai in Japan, which—to this day—only invited economically prominent people. In 1918, he was elevated in rank of baron (danshaku) in the kazoku peerage system. His son, Masuda Tarokagyu, was a noted playwright.

Masuda died in 1938, and his grave is at the Buddhist temple of Gokoku-ji in Tokyo.
