= List of Cultural Properties of Tōdai-ji =

This page lacks images; please help Wikipedia by Uploading your images to Commons

This list is of the Cultural Properties of Tōdai-ji, Nara, Japan.

== Structures ==
Image	Name	Date	Architecture	Other Comments	Designation
	East corridor 東廻廊 higashi kairō	1716-37	41x1 bay, single-storey, tiled roof	kairō	ICP
	West corridor 西廻廊 nishi kairō	1716-37	41x1 bay, single-storey, tiled roof	kairō	ICP
	Founder's Hall 開山堂 kaisandō	1200-50	3x3 bay, single-storey, hōgyō-zukuri, tiled roof	kaisandō	NT
	Repository 勧進所経庫 kanjinshokyōko	794-929	3x3 bay, azekura, yosemune-zukuri, tiled roof	Repository for donations	ICP
	Kondō (Daibutsuden) (金堂 (大仏殿))	1705	5x5 bay, single-storey with mokoshi, yosemune-zukuri, tiled roof, copper-tiled karahafu		NT
	Gorintō (五輪塔)	1185-1274			ICP
	Sanmaidō (Shigatsudō) (三昧堂(四月堂))	1681	3x3 bay, twin-storey, yosemune-zukuri, tiled roof		ICP
	Shōrō (鐘楼)	1207-10	1x1 bay, single-storey, irimoya-zukuri, tiled roof		NT
	Ōyuya (大湯屋)	1408	8x5 bay, single-storey, irimoya-zukuri front, kirizuma-zukuri rear, tiled roof, tsumairi	Bath-house	ICP
	Chūmon (中門)	1714	5 bay, three-door rōmon, tiled roof		ICP
	Tegaimon (転害門)	Nara period	3 bay, single-door hakkyakumon, kirizuma-zukuri, tiled roof		NT
	Tōzaigakumon (East) (東西楽門 (東))	1722	3 bay, single-door hakkyakumon, kirizuma-zukuri, tiled roof		ICP
	Tōzaigakumon (West) (東西楽門 (西))	1719	3 bay, single-door hakkyakumon, kirizuma-zukuri, tiled roof		ICP
	Nandaimon (南大門)	1199-1203	5 bay, three-door, twin-storey, irimoya-zukuri, tiled-roof		NT
	Nigatsu-dō (二月堂)	1669	10x7 bay, single-storey, yosemune-zukuri, tiled-roof		NT
	Nigatsu-dō sanrōsho (二月堂参籠所)	1277-1282	5x4 bay, single-storey, kirizuma-zukuri, tiled-roof	For seclusion and prayer	ICP
	Nigatsu-dō busshōya (gokūsho) (二月堂仏餉屋(御供所))	1185-1274	5x2 bay, single-storey, kirizuma-zukuri, tiled-roof	For preparation of ritual food offerings	ICP
	Nigatsu-dō akaiya (wakasaiya) (二月堂閼伽井屋(若狭井屋))	1275-1332	3x2 bay, single-storey, kirizuma-zukuri, tiled-roof	Double well for serving Buddha	ICP
	Nembutsu-dō (念仏堂)	1237	3x3 bay, single-storey, yosemune-zukuri, tiled-roof		ICP
	Hokke-dō (法華堂)	747, 1199	5x8 bay, single-storey, irimoya-zukuri front, yosemune-zukuri rear, tiled-roof		NT
	Hokke-dō repository (法華堂経庫)	794-929	3x3 bay, azekura, yosemune-zukuri, tiled-roof		ICP
	Hokke-dō temizuya (法華堂手水屋)	1335	7x4 bay, kirizuma-zukuri, tiled-roof		ICP
	Hokke-dō north gate (法華堂北門)	1240	four-post, kirizuma-zukuri, tiled-roof		ICP
	Repository 本坊経庫 honbōkyōko	710-793	3x2 bay, azekura, yosemune-zukuri, tiled-roof		NT
	Shingon'in kanjōdō 東大寺真言院灌頂堂; Tōdai-ji Shingon'in kanjōdō	1649 & following			Prefectural
	Shingon'in front gate 東大寺真言院表門; Tōdai-ji Shingon'in omotemon	1649 & following			Prefectural
	Shingon'in Jizōdō 東大寺真言院地蔵堂; Tōdai-ji Shingon'in Jizōdō	1649 & following			Prefectural
	Shingon'in kangodono 東大寺真言院神護殿; Tōdai-ji Shingon'in kangodono	1649 & following			Prefectural
	Shingon'in akaiya 東大寺真言院閼伽井屋; Tōdai-ji Shingon'in akaiya	1649 & following			Prefectural
	Shingon'in shōrō 東大寺真言院鐘楼; Tōdai-ji Shingon'in shōrō	1649 & following			Prefectural
	Shingon'in south gate 東大寺真言院南門; Tōdai-ji Shingon'in nanmon	1649 & following			Prefectural
	Kaidan'in kaidandō 東大寺戒壇院戒壇堂; Tōdai-ji Nigatsudō yuya	1733			Prefectural
	Nigatsudō bath house 東大寺二月堂湯屋; Tōdai-ji Nigatsudō yuya	mid-Edo period			Prefectural

== Paintings ==
Image	Name	Date	Medium	Other Comments	Designation
	Kusha mandala 絹本著色倶舎曼荼羅図 kenpon chakushoku kusha mandarazu	Heian period (C12)		mandala of the Kusha school	NT
	Zenzai Dōji's pilgrimage to the fifty-five places described in the Kegon Sutra 紙本著色華厳五十五所絵巻 shihon chakushoku Kegon gojūgosho emaki	twelfth century	on coloured paper; picture scroll	illustrated stories of the boy Sudhana's pilgrimage	NT
	Portrait of Kōzō Daishi 絹本著色香象大師像 kenpon chakushoku Kōzō Daishi zō	Kamakura period (C13)	colours on silk	one of the five patriarchs of the Kegon school	ICP
	Spiritual Teachers of the Kegon Ocean Assembly 絹本著色華厳海会善知識曼荼羅図 kenpon chakushoku Kegon kaie zenchishiki mandara zu	1294	colours on silk	assembly of those consulted by Zenzai Dōji; painted by Raien for Kōzan-ji; transferred to Tōdai-ji in 1421	ICP
	Fifty-five places described in the Kegon Sutra 絹本著色華厳五十五所絵 kenpon chakushoku Kegon gojūgosho e	Heian period	colours on silk	ten paintings from the twenty that are extant; the others are owned by the Fujita Art Museum, Nezu Museum, and Nara National Museum	ICP
	Legends of the Daibutsu 紙本著色東大寺大仏縁起 shihon chakushoku Tōdai-ji daibutsu engi	1536	colours on silk	illustrated legends of the daibutsu which, alongside the Legends of Hachiman, were copied and used in fundraising throughout Japan for repairs to the Daibutsuden; by Rinken; three scrolls	ICP
	Portrait of Kashō Daishi 絹本著色嘉祥大師像 kenpon chakushoku Kashō Daishi zō	Kamakura period (C13)	colours on silk	Jizang (549-623), patriarch of the Sanron school	ICP
	Portrait of Jōei Daishi 絹本著色浄影大師像 kenpon chakushoku Jōei Daishi zō	Kamakura period (C13)	colours on silk	Hui Yuan (523-592), patriarch of the Sanron school, from Dunhuang, known as the "Commentator Priest"	ICP
	Four Saintly Persons 絹本著色四聖御影 kenpon chakushoku shishōnomie	1256	colours on silk	key figures in the history of Tōdai-ji: Emperor Shōmu, Rōben, Bodhisena, and Gyōki	ICP
	Four Saintly Persons 絹本著色四聖御影 kenpon chakushoku shishōnomie	1377	colours on silk	key figures in the history of Tōdai-ji: Emperor Shōmu (rear left), Rōben (front left), Bodhisena (rear right), and Gyōki (front right); by Hokkyō Kanjō from Mino Province; copy of the 1256 version	ICP
	Eleven-headed Kannon 絹本著色十一面観音像 kenpon chakushoku Jūichimen Kannon zō	Kamakura period	colours on silk	Jūichimen Kannon	ICP
	Nigatsudō mandala 二月堂曼荼羅図; Nigatsudō mandara zu	Muromachi period		mandala	Prefectural
	History and legends of Tōdai-ji 絹本著色東大寺縁起図 kenpon chakushoku Tōdaiji engi zu	Kamakura period	colours on silk	two items	Prefectural
	Shaka triad with Sixteen Rakan 絹本著色釈迦三尊十六羅漢像 kenpon chakushoku Shaka sanzon jūroku rakan zō	Kamakura period (C14)	colours on silk	Shaka and Sixteen Rakan	Municipal

== Sculptures ==
Image	Name	Date	Medium	Other Comments	Designation
	Bonten 乾漆梵天立像 kanshitsu Bonten ryūzō	Nara period	dry lacquer	standing statue of Bonten; enshrined at the Hokkedō	NT
	Taishakuten 乾漆帝釈天立像 kanshitsu Taishakuten ryūzō	Nara period	dry lacquer	standing statue of Taishakuten; enshrined at the Hokkedō	NT
	Kongō Rikishi 乾漆金剛力士立像 kanshitsu Taishakuten ryūzō	Nara period	dry lacquer	standing statue of Agyō; enshrined at the Hokkedō	NT
	Kongō Rikishi 乾漆金剛力士立像 kanshitsu Taishakuten ryūzō	Nara period	dry lacquer	standing statue of Ungyō; enshrined at the Hokkedō	NT
	Four Heavenly Kings 乾漆四天王立像 kanshitsu shitennō ryūzō	Nara period	dry lacquer	standing statue of Jikoku-ten; enshrined at the Hokkedō	NT
	Four Heavenly Kings 乾漆四天王立像 kanshitsu shitennō ryūzō	Nara period	dry lacquer	standing statue of Zōjō-ten; enshrined at the Hokkedō	NT
	Four Heavenly Kings 乾漆四天王立像 kanshitsu shitennō ryūzō	Nara period	dry lacquer	standing statue of Kōmoku-ten; enshrined at the Hokkedō	NT
	Four Heavenly Kings 乾漆四天王立像 kanshitsu shitennō ryūzō	Nara period	dry lacquer	standing statue of Tamon-ten; enshrined at the Hokkedō	NT
	Fukūkensaku Kannon 乾漆不空羂索観音立像 kanshitsu Fukū Kensaku Kannon ryūzō	Nara period	dry lacquer	standing statue of Fukūkensaku Kannon; enshrined at the Hokkedō	NT
	Nikkō Bosatsu 塑造日光仏立像 sozō Nikkō butsu ryūzō	Nara period	clay	standing statue of Nikkō Bosatsu; enshrined at the Hokkedō	NT
	Gakkō Bosatsu 塑造月光仏立像 sozō Gakkō butsu ryūzō	Nara period	clay	standing statue of Gakkō Bosatsu; enshrined at the Hokkedō	NT
	Four Heavenly Kings 塑造四天王立像 sozō shitennō ryūzō	Nara period	clay	standing statue of Jikoku-ten; enshrined at the Kaidandō	NT
	Four Heavenly Kings 塑造四天王立像 sozō shitennō ryūzō	Nara period	clay	standing statue of Zōjō-ten; enshrined at the Kaidandō	NT
	Four Heavenly Kings 塑造四天王立像 sozō shitennō ryūzō	Nara period	clay	standing statue of Kōmoku-ten; enshrined at the Kaidandō	NT
	Four Heavenly Kings 塑造四天王立像 sozō shitennō ryūzō	Nara period	clay	standing statue of Tamon-ten; enshrined at the Kaidandō	NT
	Shukongōshin 塑造執金剛神立像 sozō shukongōshin ryūzō	Nara period	clay	standing statue of Shukongōshin; enshrined at the Hokkedō	NT
	Shaka at Birth 銅造誕生釈迦仏立像 dōzō tanjō Shaka butsu ryūzō	Nara period	bronze	for the ceremony on Buddha's Birthday	NT
	Vairocana 銅造盧舎那仏坐像 dōzō Rushana butsu zazō	752	bronze	daibutsu; restored; enshrined at the Daibutsuden	NT
	Kongō Rikishi 木造金剛力士立像 mokuzō kongōrikishi ryūzō	1203	wood	standing statue of Agyō; located at the Nandaimon; by Unkei, Kaikei, and 13 assistant sculptors.	NT
	Kongō Rikishi 木造金剛力士立像 mokuzō kongōrikishi ryūzō	1203	wood	standing statue of Ungyō; located at the Nandaimon; by Jōkaku, Tankei, and 12 assistant sculptors	NT
	Chōgen 木造俊乗上人坐像 mokuzō Shunjō shōnin zazō	c. 1206	wood	seated statue of Chōgen, in charge or rebuilding Tōdai-ji after the 1180 fire; enshrined at the Shunjōdō or Chōgen Hall	NT
	Hachiman in the guise of a monk 木造僧形八幡神坐像 mokuzō sōgyō Hachimanjin zazō	1201	wood	Hachiman in the guise of a monk, by Kaikei; enshrined at the Kanjinsho Hachimanden (see Hachiman shrine and Chinjusha)	NT
	Priest Rōben 木造良弁僧正坐像 mokuzō Rōben sōjō zazō	Heian period (late C9)	wood	seated statue of Rōben, founder of Tōdai-ji; enshrined at the Kaisandō or Founder's Hall	NT
	Shaka Nyorai 木造釈迦如来坐像 mokuzō Shaka Nyorai zazō	1225	wood	seated statue of Shaka Nyorai; by Zen'en (善慶)	ICP
	Miroku 木造弥勒菩薩坐像 mokuzō Miroku bosatsu zazō	Heian period	wood	seated statue of Miroku; said to be the personal devotional of Rōben, but generally dated later on stylistic grounds	ICP
	Amida Nyorai 木造阿弥陀如来坐像 mokuzō Amida Nyorai zazō	Heian period	wood	seated statue of Amida Nyorai; enshrined at the Kangakuin	ICP
	Amida Nyorai 木造阿弥陀如来立像 mokuzō Amida Nyorai ryūzō	Kamakura period	wood	standing statue of Amida Nyorai; enshrined at the Shunjōdō	ICP
	Amida Nyorai 木造阿弥陀如来坐像 mokuzō Amida Nyorai zazō	Kamakura period	wood	seated statue of Amida Nyorai	ICP
	Stone Lion 石造獅子 sekizō shishi	Kamakura period	stone	shishi by Chin Wakei (陳和卿); at the Nandaimon	ICP
	Nimbus in the shape of a boat 銅造舟形光背 dōzō funagata kōhai	Nara period	bronze		ICP
	Jizō bosatsu 木造地蔵菩薩坐像 mokuzō Jizō bosatsu zazō	Kamakura period	wood	seated statue of Jizō; enshrined at the Hokkedō	ICP
	Jizō bosatsu 木造地蔵菩薩坐像 mokuzō Jizō bosatsu zazō	Kamakura period	wood	seated statue of Jizō; enshrined at the Nembutsudō (see Nembutsu)	ICP
	Jizō bosatsu 木造地蔵菩薩坐像 mokuzō Jizō bosatsu ryūzō	Kamakura period	wood	standing statue of Jizō	ICP
	Jizō bosatsu 木造地蔵菩薩坐像 mokuzō Jizō bosatsu ryūzō	Kamakura period	wood	standing statue of Jizō; by Kaikei; located at the Kōkeidō	ICP
	Aizen Myōō 木造愛染明王坐像 mokuzō Aizen Myōō zazō	Heian period	wood	seated statue of Aizen Myōō; enshrined at the Shunjōdō	ICP
	Aizen Myōō 木造愛染明王坐像 mokuzō Aizen Myōō zazō	Muromachi period	wood	seated statue of Aizen Myōō	ICP
	Benzaiten 塑造弁財天吉祥天立像 sozō Benzaiten Kisshōten ryūzō	Nara period	clay	standing statue of Benzaiten	ICP
	Kisshōten 塑造弁財天吉祥天立像 sozō Benzaiten Kisshōten ryūzō	Nara period	clay	standing statue of Kisshōten	ICP
Tamonten Guardian in the Todaiji temple, Kyoto, Japan.	Tamonten 木造多聞天立像 mokuzō Tamonten ryūzō	1178	wood	standing statue of Tamonten	ICP
	Senjū Kannon 木造千手観音立像 mokuzō Senjū Kannon ryūzō	Heian period	wood	standing statue of the Thousand-armed Kannon; enshrined at the Sanmaidō (Shigatsudō)	ICP
	Gokōshii Amida 木造五劫思惟弥陀仏坐像 mokuzō Gokōshii Mida butsu zazō	Muromachi period	wood	seated statue of Gokōshii Amida; enshrined at the Kangakuin	ICP
	Fudō Myōō with two attendants 木造不動明王二童子像 mokuzō Fudō Myōō nidōshizō	1373	wood	enshrined at the Hokkedō	ICP
	Kariteimo 木造訶梨帝母坐像 mokuzō Kariteimo zazō	Heian period	wood	seated statue of Kariteimo; enshrined at the Shuni-e shukusho	ICP
	Ganjin 木造鑑真和尚坐像 mokuzō Ganjin oshō zazō	1733	wood	seated statue of Ganjin	ICP
	Jikoku-ten 木造持国天立像 mokuzō Jikokuten ryūzō	Heian period (1178)	wood	standing statue of Jikoku-ten	ICP
	Nyoirin Kannon 銅造如意輪観音半跏像 dōzō Nyoirin Kannon hankazō	Heian period	bronze	half-cross-legged statue of Nyoirin Kannon	ICP
	Seimen Kongō 木造青面金剛立像 mokuzō Seimen Kongō ryūzō	Heian period	wood	standing statue of Shōmen Kongō	ICP
	Twelve Heavenly Generals 木造十二神将立像 mokuzō jūnishinshō ryūzō	Heian period	wood	twelve standing statues of the Twelve Heavenly Generals	ICP
	Four Heavenly Kings 木造四天王立像 mokuzō shitennō ryūzō	1281	wood	four standing statues of the Four Heavenly Kings	ICP
	Shō Kannon 木造聖観音立像 mokuzō Shō Kannon ryūzō	Kamakura period	wood	standing statue of Shō Kannon	ICP
	Jūichimen Kannon 木造十一面観音立像 mokuzō Jūichimen Kannon ryūzō	Heian period	wood	standing statue of Jūichimen Kannon	ICP
	Enma-Ō 木造閻魔王坐像 mokuzō Enma-ō zazō	Kamakura period	wood	seated statue of Enma-Ō	ICP
	Taizan Fukun 木造泰山府君坐像 mokuzō Taizan Fukun zazō	Kamakura period	wood	seated statue of Taizan Fukun	ICP
	Bosatsu 木造菩薩立像 mokuzō Bosatsu ryūzō	1190-98	wood	standing statue of a bodhisattva	ICP
	Nyoirin Kannon & Kokūzō Bosatsu 木造〈如意輪観音／虚空蔵菩薩〉坐像 mokuzō Nyoirin Kannon / Kokūzō Bosatsu zazō	1726-55	wood	seated statues of Nyoirin Kannon & Kokūzō Bosatsu; enshrined in the Daibutsuden; Kei school	ICP
	Images inside a miniature shrine: Senjū Kannon and Four Heavenly Kings 厨子入／木造千手観音立像／木造四天王立像 zushi-iri/mokuzō Senjū Kannon ryūzō/mokuzō shitennō ryūzō	Kamakura period	wood	standing statues of Thousand-armed Kannon and Four Heavenly Kings; enshrined at the Kaidan'in Senjūdō	ICP
	Lion head 木造獅子頭 mokuzō shishi gashira	Kamakura period	wood	shishi	ICP
	Kōkei 木造公慶上人坐像 mokuzō Kōkei shōnin zazō	1706	wood		ICP
	Gigaku masks 木造伎楽面 乾漆伎楽面 mokuzō gigaku men - kanshitsu gigakumen	752	for gigaku; wood (29); dry lacquer (1)	thirty inscribed masks	ICP
	Gigaku masks 木造伎楽面 乾漆伎楽面 mokuzō gigaku men	1196	wood	two inscribed masks	ICP
	Bugaku masks 木造舞楽面 mokuzō bugaku men	Heian and Kamakura period	wood	for Bugaku; nine masks	ICP
	Gyōdō masks 木造行道面 mokuzō gyōdō men	1086 & 1334	wood	for gyōdō; two masks	ICP
	Bosatsu masks 木造菩薩面 mokuzō bosatsu men	1158	wood	three bodhisattva masks	ICP
	Fudō Myōō 木造不動明王坐像 mokuzō Fudō Myōō zazō	Heian period	wood	seated statue of Fudō Myōō	Prefectural

== Crafts ==
Image	Name	Date	Type	Other Comments	Designation
	Kondō consecration objects 東大寺金堂鎭壇具; Tōdaiji kondō chindangu	c.750	designated as "archaeological materials"	Small gilt silver bowl with a hunting motif, swords, armor, a mirror, a fragment of a lacquer box, a crystal box, crystal objects, amber beads, glass beads and 22 crystal beads	NT
	Temple bell 梵鐘 bonshō	752			NT
	Octagonal gilt bronze lantern 金銅八角燈籠 kondō hakkaku tōrō	Nara period		located in front of the Daibutsuden	NT
	Box with flower and bird design 花鳥彩絵油色箱 kachō saieyushokubako	Nara period			NT
	Deer hide with grape arabesque pattern 葡萄唐草文染韋 budō karakusamon somekawa	Nara period			NT
	Imperial plaque for the Saidaimon 木造西大門勅額 mokuzō Saidaimon chokugaku	Nara period			ICP
	Bell 梵鐘 bonshō	1264		at the Shingon'in	ICP
	Sutra chest with cloud and phoenix design 雲鳳鎗金経櫃 unhōsō kinkyō hitsu	Yuan dynasty		at the Tokyo National Museum; from China	ICP
	Gong with peacock design 孔雀文磬 kujaku monkei	Kamakura period			ICP
	Ewer 銅水瓶 dō suibyō	1305	bronze	with inscription of date and location in the Kaidan'in; two items	ICP
	Perfume jars 銅香水杓 dō kōsuishaku	Kamakura period	bronze	four items	ICP
	Lock (with key) 鉄鑰鍵付 tetsu yaku (kagi tsuki)	Kamakura period	iron		ICP
	Small bell 堂司鈴 dōshirei	1285			ICP
	Bell 梵鐘 bonshō	1308		located inside the Nigatsudō	ICP
	Waniguchi 鰐口 waniguchi	Kamakura period			ICP
	Lacquer bowls 朱漆布薩盥 shu urushi fusatsu tarai	1427		three items	ICP
	Lacquer trays 二月堂練行衆盤; Nigatsudō rengyō shūban	1298		inscribed; from the Nigatsudō; with cedar box; eleven items	ICP
	Vessel 木製黒漆油壺 mokusei kokushitsu abura tsubo	1330		wooden core, black lacquer, oil; two items	ICP
	Lacquer drum body 黒漆鼓胴 kokushitsu kodō	Nara period		black lacquer; two items	ICP
	Painted drum body 彩絵鼓胴 sai-e kodō	Kamakura period			ICP
	Painted drum body 彩絵鼓胴 sai-e kodō	1232			ICP
	Black lacquer table with mother-of-pearl inserts 黒漆螺鈿卓 kokushitsu raden taku	Heian period		raden	ICP
	Five-lion nyoi 五獅子如意 go shishi nyoi	Heian period		ritual implement decorated with five lions	ICP
	Tortoiseshell nyoi 玳瑁如意 taimai nyoi	Heian period			ICP
	Bathtub 鉄湯船 tetsu yubune	Kamakura period	iron	at the Ōyuya (bath house)	ICP
	Iron lanterns 鉄釣燈籠 tetsutsuri tōrō	Kamakura period	iron	two "fishing" lanterns; at the Hokkedō	ICP
	Stone lantern 石燈籠 ishi dōrō	1254	stone	tōrō	ICP
	Kane 鉦鼓 shōkō	1134		kane (instrument)	ICP
	Kane 鉦鼓 shōkō	1198		kane (instrument)	ICP
	Gilt bronze base 金銅受台 kondō ukedai	Nara period			ICP
	Bronze pot 銅鉢 dōhatsu	Nara period			ICP
	Gilt bronze pots 金銅鉢 kondōhatsu	Nara period		two items	ICP
	Gilt bronze hōtō 金銅宝塔 kondō hōtō	1411			Prefectural

== Documents ==
Image	Name	Date	Type	Other Comments	Designation
	Documents of Tōdai-ji 東大寺文書; Tōdai-ji monjo	Heian to Muromachi period	designated as "ancient documents"	100 scrolls with 979 mounted documents; 8,516 single-sheet documents	NT
	Sutra of the Wise and Foolish 賢愚経; Kengu-kyō	Nara period		one scroll (vol. 15)	NT
	Kenkō-kyō 賢劫経; Kenkō-kyō shihonbokusho makimono	Nara period		one scroll	ICP
	Daibibasharon 大毘婆沙論 daibibasharon	740		Abhidharma Mahāvibhāṣa Śāstra; one scroll (vol. 23)	ICP
	Annals of Tōdai-ji 東大寺要録; Tōdai-ji yōroku	Kamakura period		ten volumes	ICP
	Annals of Tōdai-ji continued 東大寺要録続録; Tōdai-ji yōroku zokuroku	Muromachi period		nine volumes	ICP
	Daiitoku Darani-kyō 大威徳陀羅尼経; Daiitoku darani-kyō	740		ten scrolls	ICP
	Daihōtō daishū bosatsu nenmbutsu sanmai-kyō 大方等大集菩薩念仏三昧経; Daihōtō daishū bosatsu nenmbutsu sanmai-kyō	Nara period		ten scrolls	ICP
	Nirvana Sutra 大般涅槃経; Daihatsu nehan-gyō	Nara period		Nirvana Sutra; forty scrolls	ICP
	Discourse on the Stages of Yogic Practice 瑜伽師地論; Yugashichi-ron	740		Yogācārabhūmi Śāstra; four scrolls (12, 13, 14, 17)	ICP
	Flower Garland Sutra 華厳経; Kegon-kyō	798		Kegon Sutra; six scrolls (1, 4, 5, 6, 9, 11)	ICP
	Kokūzō-kyō 虚空蔵経; Kokūzō-kyō	Tang dynasty		from China; eight scrolls	ICP
	Saijikonkōmyōsaishōō-kyō 細字金光明最勝王経; Saijikonkōmyōsaishōō-kyō	Heian period		one scroll	ICP
	Soku Kegon ryakukyō sokanteiki 続華厳略経疏刊定記 soku Kegon ryakukyō sokanteiki	Nara period		five scrolls	ICP
	Hokketōryaku 法華統略; Hokketōryaku	Heian period		one scroll	ICP
	Perfection of Transcendent Wisdom Sutra 金剛般若経; Kongō hannya-kyō	844		Prajnaparamita sutra; first scroll	ICP
	Hyakubōkenyūshō 百法顕幽抄; Hyakubōkenyūshō	Tang dynasty (843)		from China; first scroll	ICP
	Kōsōdenrokushu 高僧伝六種; Kōsōdenrokushu	Kamakura period		nine scrolls	ICP
	Account of the deeds of Enshō 円照上人行状記; Enshō shōnin gyōjōki	1302		deeds of Enshō (円照), with brushwork by Gyōnen (凝然); three scrolls	ICP
	Konma 羯磨; Konma	Nara period		two scrolls	ICP
	Precepts for Monks and Nuns 弥沙塞羯磨本; Misasoku Konma Bon	Nara period		one scroll	ICP
	Flower Garland Sutra 紺紙金字華厳経 konshi ginji Kegon-kyō	Kamakura period	silver ink on dark blue paper	eighty scrolls	ICP
	Ganmonshū 願文集 ganmonshū	Kamakura period		one scroll	ICP
	Tōdaiji sōshō hitsu shōkyō narabini-shō 東大寺宗性筆聖教並抄録本; Tōdaiji sōshō hitsu shōkyō narabini-shō	Kamakura period		99 scrolls, 347 sheets	ICP
	Tōdaiji Gyōnen senjutsu shōsorui 東大寺凝然撰述章疏類; Tōdaiji gyōzen senjutsu shōsho-rui	Kamakura period		146 scrolls	ICP
	Flower Garland Sutra 高麗版華厳経随疏演義鈔 kōraiban Kegon-kyō zuiso engi shō	Joseon dynasty		from Korea; forty scrolls	ICP
	Konkōmyō-saishōō-kyō chūshaku 金光明最勝王経註釈; Konkōmyōsaishōō-kyō chūshaku	Heian period		two scrolls (5, 9)	ICP
	Tōdai-ji daikanjinsōgyō yūjihitsu shojō 東大寺大勧進僧行勇自筆書状; Tōdai-ji daikanjinsōgyō yūjihitsu shojō	Kamakura period		one volume	ICP
	Inventory of objects for Amida Keka service 紙本墨書阿弥陀悔過料資財帳 shihonbokusho Amida kekaryō shizaichō	767	designated as "ancient documents"	one scroll	ICP
	Solicitation for funds by Chōgen (Genkyū 2 (1205)) 元久二年重源上人勧進状; Genkyū ninen Chōgen shōnin kanjinjō	1205	ancient documents	one scroll	ICP
	Register of slaves in Tōdai-ji 東大寺奴婢見来帳; Tōdai-ji nuhiken raichō	751/6	ancient documents	one scroll	ICP
	Record of Tōdai-ji estate in Echizen Province 越前国田使解; Echizen no kuni denshige	756, 757	ancient documents	early shōen in Echizen Province; two scrolls (scrolls 2 and 3; scroll 1 from 755 is at the Gotoh Museum)	ICP
	Eisai jihitsu tōboku hitsukenjōjō 栄西自筆唐墨筆献上状; Eisai jihitsu tōboku hitsukenjōjō	1270	ancient documents	one volume	ICP
	Sōbō Gekishu ganmonan 僧某逆修願文案 sōbō Gekishu ganmonan	1198	ancient documents	one scroll	ICP
	Document concerning Amida-ji estate in Suō Province 周防国阿弥陀寺領田畠注文; Suō no kuni Amida-ji ryō denbata chūmon	1200	ancient documents	relating to fundraising for reconstruction; one scroll	ICP
	Flower Garland Sutra 紺紙銀字華厳経 konshi ginji Kegon-kyō	Nara period	ancient documents	silver ink on dark blue paper; damaged in the 1667 fire during the Omizutori that destroyed the Nigatsudō; twenty scrolls, eighteen of which were once pasted onto screens	ICP
	Document from Dajōkan 太政官宣旨; Dajōkan senji	808	ancient documents	from Dajōkan; one scroll	ICP
	Records of the Nigatsudō Shuni-e 二月堂修二会記録文書; Nigatsudō Shuni-e kirokumonsho	Heian to Shōwa periods	ancient documents	relating to the Shuni-e; 293 volumes, 2107 sheets	ICP
	Records of the Tōdai-ji Kaidan'in 東大寺戒壇院指図; Tōdai-ji Kaidan'in sashizu	Muromachi to Momoyama periods	designated as "historic materials"	one collection	ICP
	Matsubara collection 松原文庫; Matsubara bunko	Edo to Shōwa periods		1090 documents	Registered

== Monuments ==
Image	Name	Date	Type	Other Comments	Designation
	Old precincts of Tōdai-ji 東大寺旧境内; Tōdai-ji kyūkeidai	N/A	Historic Site		National
	Old precincts of Tōdai-ji Tōnan'in 東大寺東南院旧境内; Tōdai-ji Tōnan'in kyūkeidai	N/A	Historic Site		National
	Kagami-ike habitat for fish (ischikauia) 東大寺鏡池棲息ワタカ; Kagamiike seisoku wataka	N/A	Natural Monument	lit. "mirror pond"; the species is endemic to Japan	Prefectural

== See also ==
- Cultural Properties of Japan
- List of National Treasures of Japan (temples)
- List of National Treasures of Japan (paintings)
- List of National Treasures of Japan (sculptures)
- List of National Treasures of Japan (crafts: others)
- List of National Treasures of Japan (archaeological materials)
- List of National Treasures of Japan (ancient documents)
- List of National Treasures of Japan (writings: others)
- Monuments of Japan
