= Tōdai-ji Hachiman =

A Shinto-Buddhist national treasure held at Todai-ji by sculptor Kaikei

- (木造僧形八幡神坐像, Mokuzō Sōgyō Hachimanjin Zazō) (Japanese)
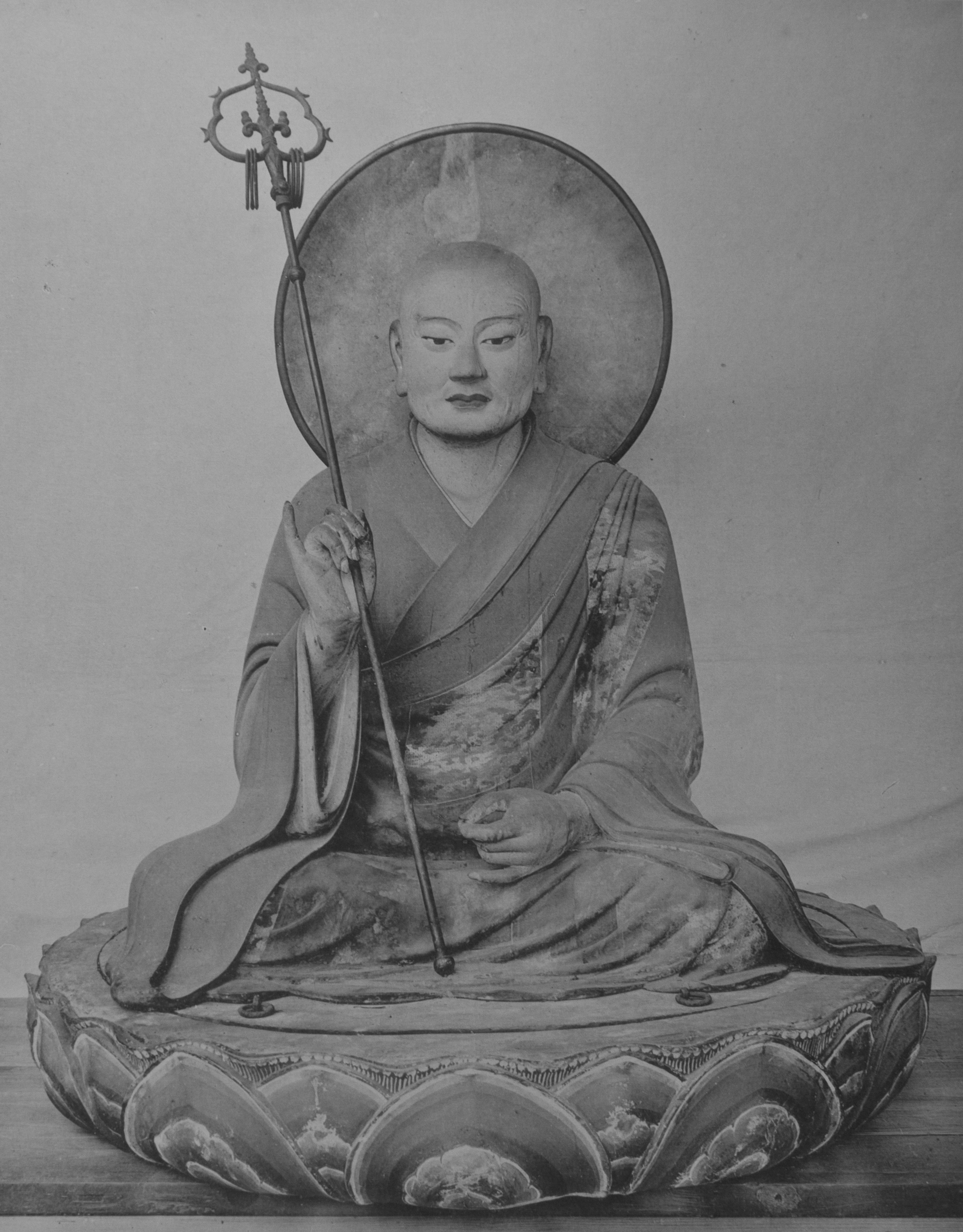
- Artist: Kaikei
- Year: 1201
- Medium: Wood and polychromy
- Movement: Kei school
- Dimensions: 87.1 cm (34.3 in)
- Designation: National Treasure,
- Location: Nara
- Owner: Tōdai-ji

The Tōdai-ji Hachiman (Japanese:木造僧形八幡神坐像, Romaji: Mokuzō Sōgyō Hachimanjin Zazō) is a syncretic Shinto-Buddhist sculpture of the kami Hachiman carved in 1201 by Buddhist sculptor Kaikei. Currently housed in the Hall of Hachiman (Hachiman-den) in Tōdai-ji, it is classified as a National Treasure of Japan since 19 February 1957 (upgraded from previous status as Important Cultural Property on 2 August 1901), and is the only syncretic piece by him.

The sculpture is considered a prominent example of Buddhist sculpture in the early Kamakura period under the Kei school, and its creation was extensively documented from chronicles and diaries written during the 13th century.

== Background ==
Up til the Meiji Restoration, syncretism was prominent between Shintoism and Buddhism, in the form of shinbutsu-shūgō, in which the history of Hachiman worship was closely involved with the construction of Tōdai-ji in 749. With sponsorship from Usa Jingū, Hachiman became a chinjujin, the guardian kami of the temple, and throughout the Heian Period, images of Sōgyō Hachiman (in monk form) have been present in Japanese temples.

In 1180, following the Siege of Nara, when Tōdai-ji and Kōfuku-ji, were set on fire, Tōdai-ji saw extensive reconstruction and renovation under its abbot Chōgen (1121-1206), as he sought to arrange the campus in the style of Southern Song architecture in China.

The sculpture's origins as well as the inception of the sculpture was chronicled in the Tōdai-ji Hachiman Genki, written in 1237. As the reconstruction of the temple proceeded, Hachiman, who had seen popular worship and attention as the guardian kami of Tōdai-ji, had his hall erected with much support by Chōgen and the monks in 1194.

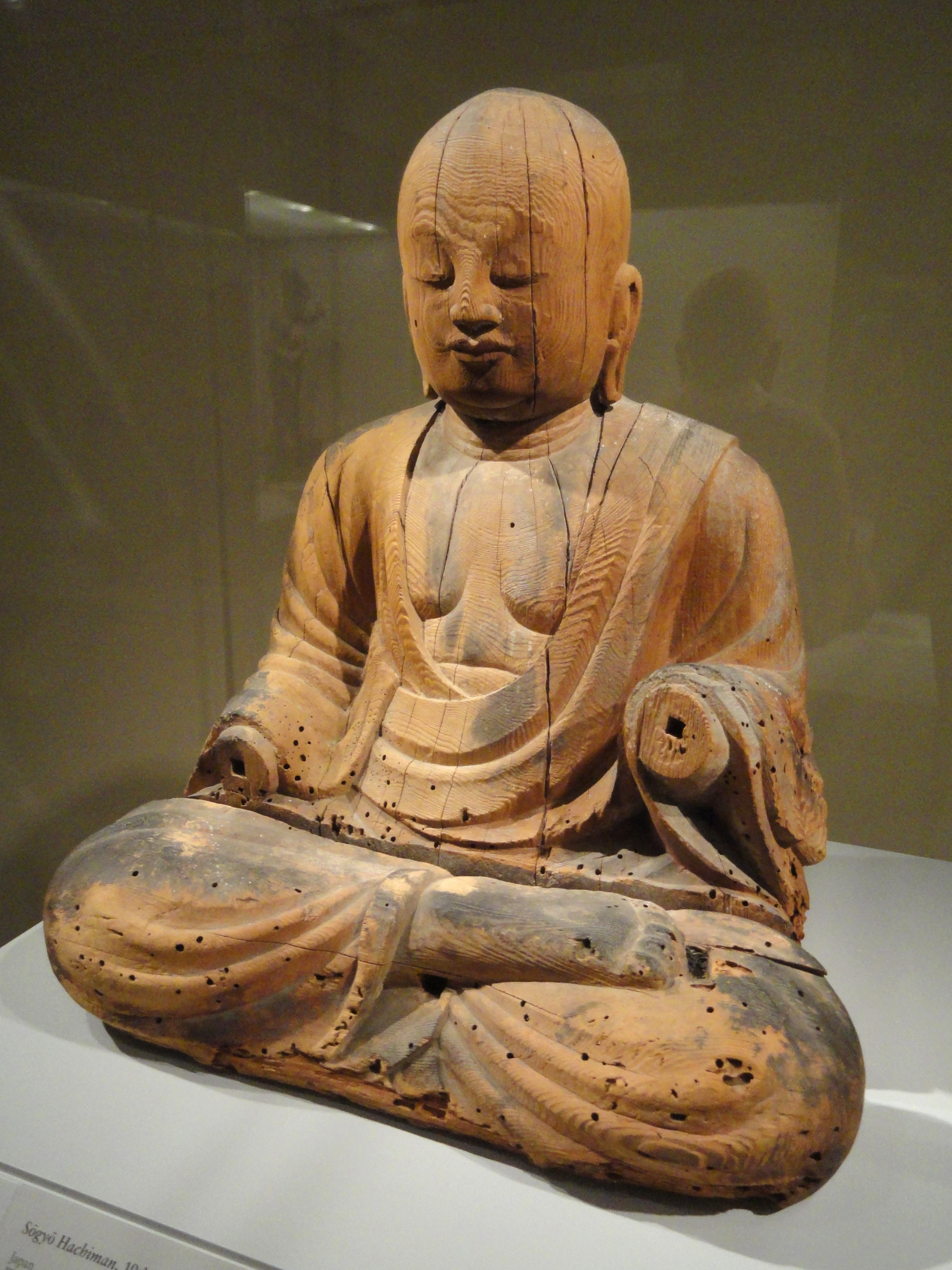
An earlier example of a Sōgyo Hachiman (as monk), Heian period, now on display at the Art Institute of Chicago (1960.755)

The chronicle also described disputes and repeated requests by the monks towards the Kamakura shogunate for approval of an image of Hachiman to decorate the hall. There was a push towards the acquisition of a painting of Hachiman, attributed to Kūkai, in the collection of Emperor Toba, formerly owned by Jingo-ji, augmented a claimed vision by the Tōdai-ji monks that they witnessed a homeless red-robed Hachiman at the Great South Gate (Nandaimon) of the temple. It was seen that the ownership of the image is considered a preciously kept secret, given the aggressiveness of the attempted acquisition by the monastery, as well as the fact that an image from Ninna-ji, was secretly copied from the Jingo-ji painting. In the end, the attempted ownership of the painting failed, so Tōdai-ji opted for the carving of a new image by Kaikei.

== The Sculpture ==
Kaikei's sculpture differs from an older Heian period image that is currently held by Yakushi-ji (also classified as a National Treasure). Whereas the Yakushi-ji Hachiman is a triad image, accompanied by a sculpture of Nakatsuhime and Empress Jingū (as Hachiman is the deification of Emperor Ōjin), Kaikei's sculpture is a solitary image of Hachiman as a monk.

Kaikei's Hachiman relies on realism and polychromy, the deity is seen legs crossed, left hand on the lap, right hand held at chest level, staff in hand. He wears a grey undergarment, ochre robe, and is painted with a tōyama pattern, wisps of reds (shades of lacquer and cinnabar), greens and blues.

Unlike the Tō-ji Hachiman, whose chest is exposed, Kaikei was focused on making his Hachiman as realistic as possible, with the resemblance to an actual monk. Reduced emphasis on bone structure, wrinkles are to emphasize the statue's status as a god, though the polychromy is utilized to accentuate on its human features. The statue sits on a lotus pedestal and is framed with a gold halo, to designate his divinity.

Typical to that of Kei school craftmanship, Hachiman was carved with the yosegi zukuri technique, made of multiple interlocking blocks which assembles the front portion and the back portion as such, the Hachiman has broad shoulders and flattened chest due to the assembly method.

The names of the sculpture's donors are etched in a smooth surface within the cavity of the carving:

Imperial House of Japan: Emperor Tsuchimikado, Emperor Go-Toba, Prince Shūkaku, Emperor Go-Shirakawa, Shichijō Nyoin, Hachijō Nyoin

Priesthood: Myōe, Myōhen, Ebin, (Chōgen's name does not appear in the sculpture despite being involved in its inception)

In addition: laymen of the Taira clan, Minamoto clan, Fujiwara clans are named alongside 28 sculptors (kobusshi), members of workshops by Kōkei, Myoēn, and Inson are identified with Kaikei's signature in place.

As such, the sculpture is a testament to the intimacy with the clergy, the regency and the Imperial family during the Kamakura shogunate.

== Display ==
Held in the Hachiman-den within the Kanjin-sho of Tōdai-ji, every year on October, after religious services, the sculpture is displayed to the public alongside that of the Five Kalpas of Reflection by the Buddha Amida, and a sculpture of the priest Kōkei, both of which are designated Important Cultural Properties.

== See also ==
- List of Cultural Properties of Tōdai-ji
  - Statue of Chōgen - another statue in Tōdai-ji attributed to either Kaikei or Unkei
- List of National Treasures of Japan (sculptures)
