= Chōgen (monk) =

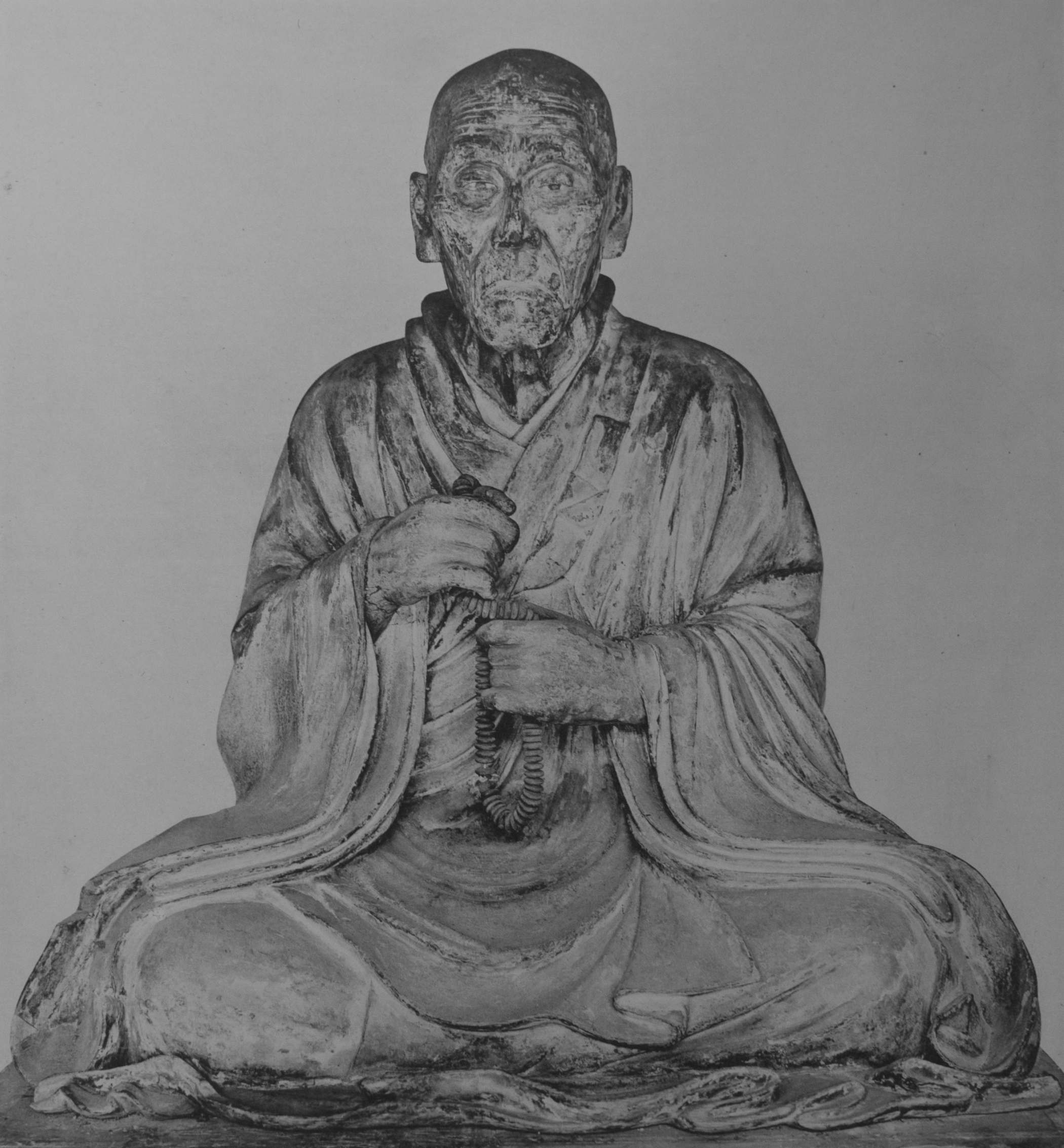
- Portrait of Chōgen, enshrined in the Shunjodo at Tōdai-ji
- Title: Tōdai-ji reconstruction great Kanjin, Dai-Osho(great monk)

Personal life
- Born: Kino Shigesada; 1121 Kyoto
- Died: 1206 (aged 84–85) Nara, Tōdai-ji
- Other name: Shunjobo
- Occupation: Responsible person for the reconstruction of Buddha statue at Todaiji

Religious life
- Religion: Buddhism
- Dharma name: Chōgen

Senior posting
- Based in: Tōdai-ji, Nara
- Successor: Myonan Eisai as Dai-Kanjin

Chōgen (重源) (1121-1206), also known as Shunjōbō Chōgen (俊乗坊重源), was a Japanese Buddhist monk. From 1181 he devoted twenty-five years of his life to the endowment and rebuilding of Tōdai-ji after its destruction in war.

== Sources ==
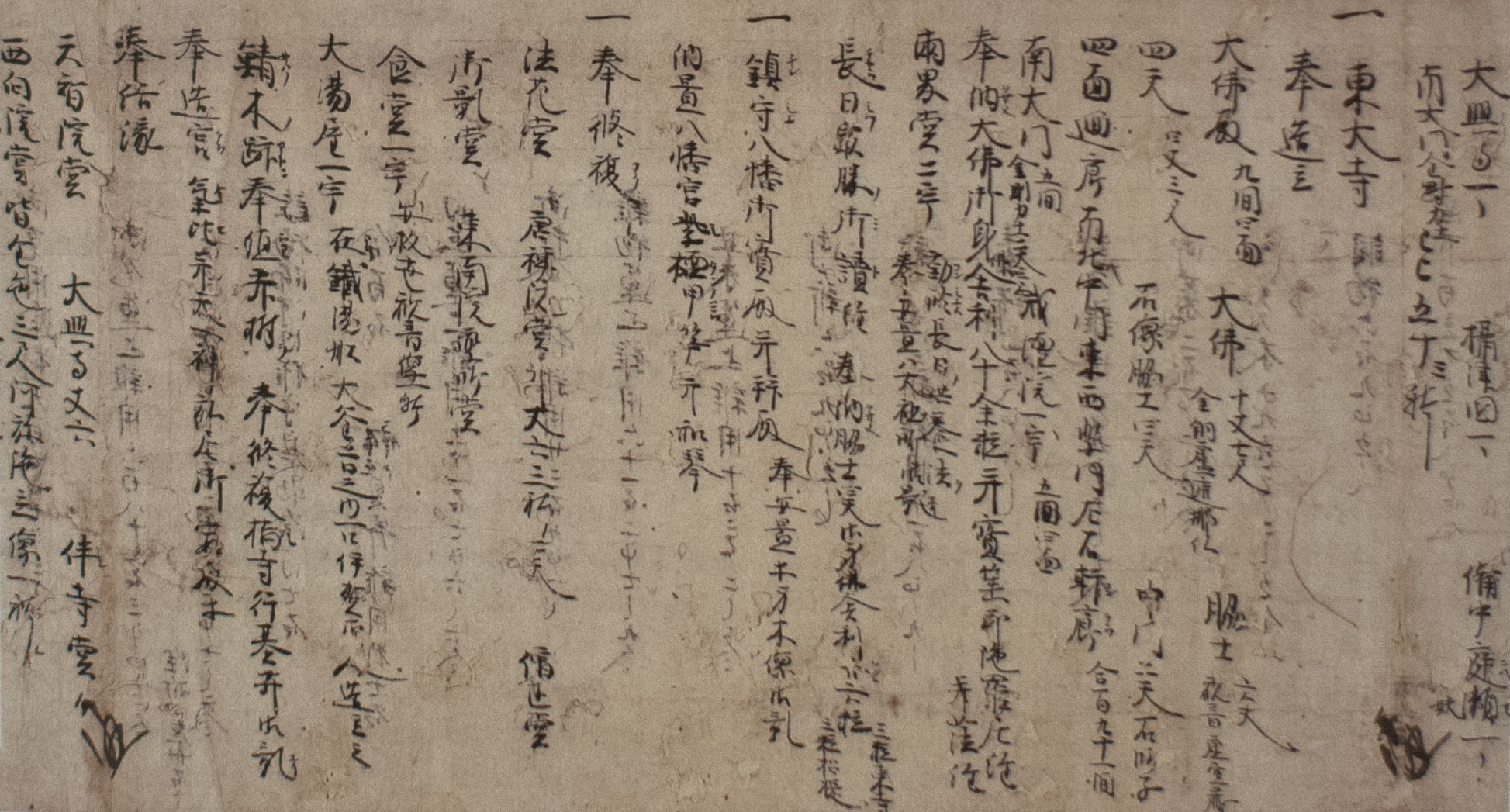
Benevolent Deeds of Namu-Amidabutsu or Chōgen's Memoir, lines 9-31, c. 1203 (ICP); at the Historiographical Institute, the University of Tokyo

A contemporary record known as the Benevolent Deeds of Namu-Amidabutsu provides the fullest evidence for Chōgen's life and career. This may be supplemented by diaries such as the Jewelled Leaves (玉葉) of Fujiwara no Kanezane; temple records; documents including Solicitation for Funds by Chōgen in Genkyū 2; and inscriptions including one on stone dating to 1202 from Kawachi Province recording his repair of irrigation channels first constructed by Gyōki Bosatsu. By the time of the illustrated Tōdaiji Daibutsu engi of the 1530s, which includes a scene of Chōgen at sea conveying logs for the great rebuilding, invocation of his memory could include a "mixture of fact and fable".

== Biography ==
Born most likely in Kyoto in 1121, Chōgen was initiated into religious life at the Shingon centre of Daigo-ji at age thirteen. Later in his teens he undertook ascetic practices in Shikoku and at Mount Ōmine, followed in his early twenties by time at Koyasan. After assorted pious deeds, including chanting the nembutsu a million times and the donation of statues and sutras to a number of temples, involvement in public works in the manner of Gyōki and Kūya, and possible trips to China, in 1181 Chōgen was appointed to raise funds for the reconstruction of Tōdai-ji. Over the next twenty-five years he oversaw repairs to the Giant Buddha, the hall in which it was housed, the south gate, and numerous other buildings in the temple complex, as well as being involved in the commissioning of numerous replacement images. He also continued his civic works, repairing bridges, driving robbers from the mountains, and easing the distress of man and beast. He finally died in the Pure Land hall at Tōdai-ji at the age of eighty-five in 1206.

== See also ==
- Rōben
- List of National Treasures of Japan (sculptures)
- List of Cultural Properties of Tōdai-ji
- Kanjin
