= Jōdo-ji (Ono) =

Coordinates: 34.8642°N 134.961°E

Gokurakusan Jōdo-ji
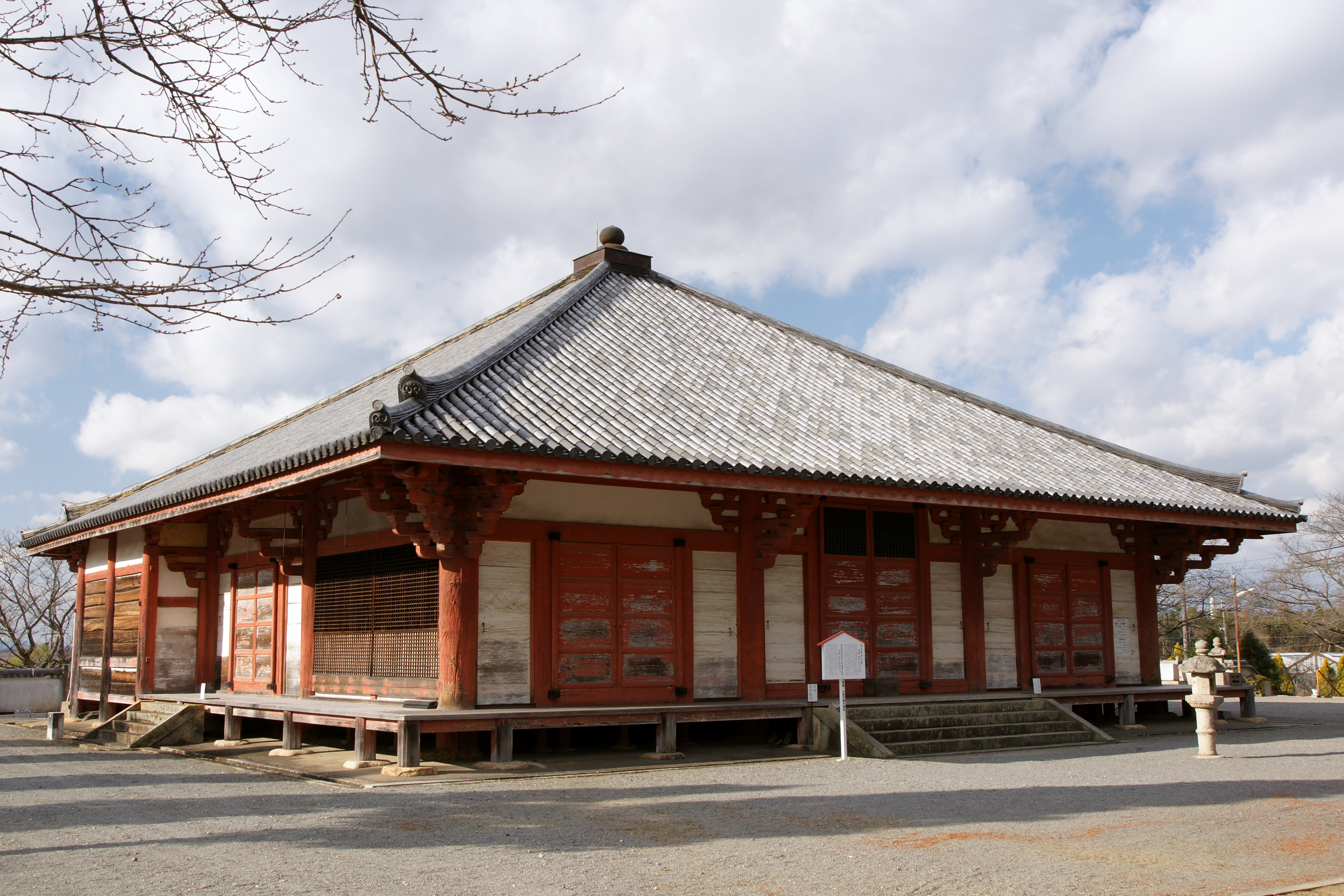
- Jōdodō

Religion
- Affiliation: Shingon

Location
- Location: 2094, Kiyotani-cho, Ono, Hyogo 675–1317
- Country: Japan
- Interactive map of Gokurakusan Jōdo-ji

Architecture
- Founder: Chōgen
- Established: 1190–1198
- Completed: 1632 (Reconstruction)

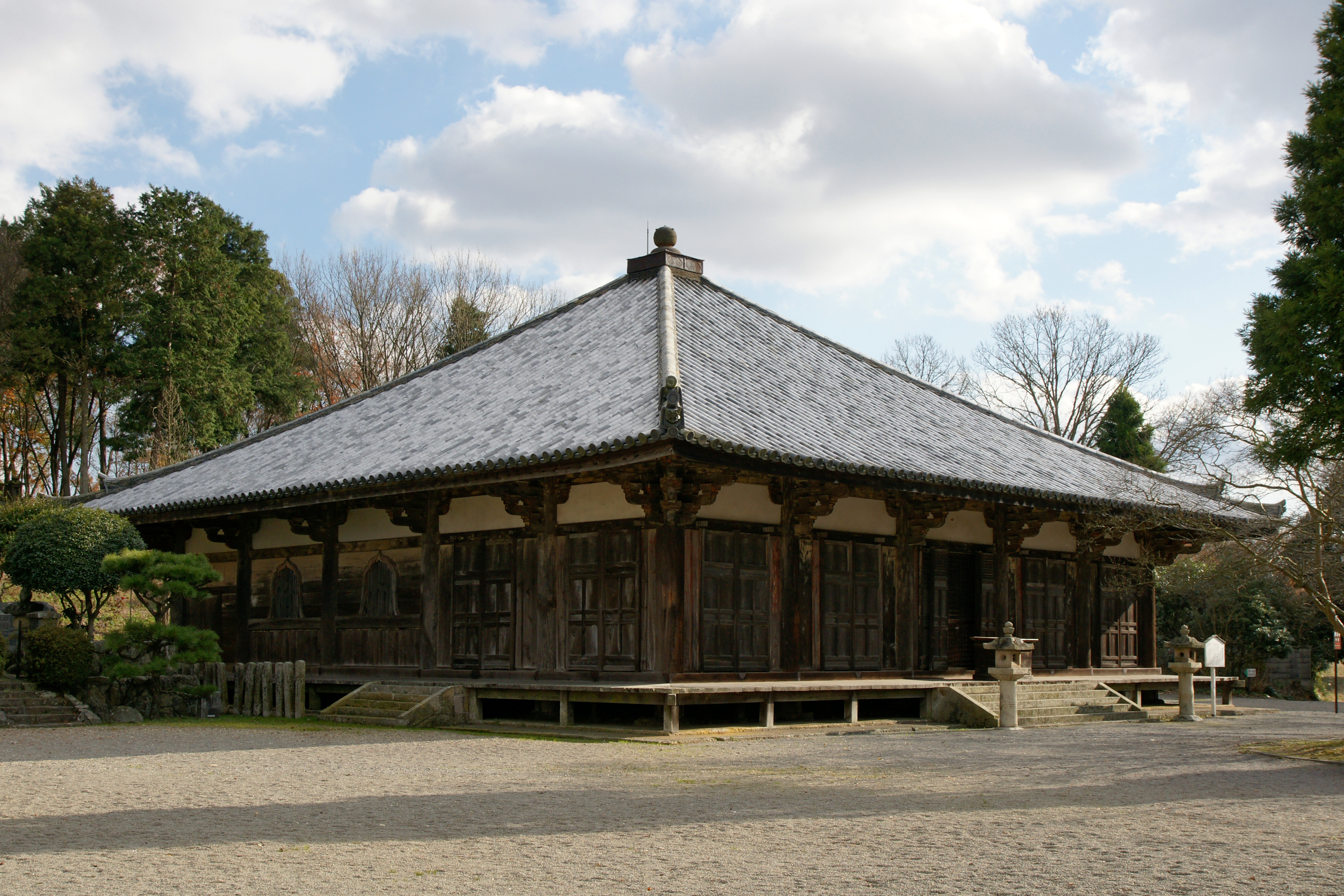
Yakushido (Main hall)

The Gokurakusan Jōdo-ji (極楽山浄土寺) is a temple of the Shingon sect in Ono, Hyōgo, Japan. It was first established by Chōgen in 1190 – 1198, and the temple structures have undergone several reconstruction efforts since then, with the last reconstruction taking place in 1632.

Jōdo-ji's Jōdodō completed in 1194 is a National Treasure of Japan. The architecture is in the Daibutsu style that combines Japanese and Chinese elements.

== List of buildings ==
- Jōdodō – built in 1194. National Treasure of Japan.
- Yakushiō (Main hall) – Important Cultural Property of Japan. It was rebuilt in 1517.
- Hachiman-jinja honden – Important Cultural Property of Japan.
- Hachiman-jinja haiden – Important Cultural Property of Japan.
- Kaizanō – rebuilt in 1520.
- Bell tower – rebuilt in 1632.
- Fudodō
- Monjudō
- Kyozō

== List of sculptures ==
- Amitabha Triad – National Treasure of Japan. Kaikei's most important work. It is a work in 1195–1197. Height: 24.6 ft
- Amitabha – Important Cultural Property of Japan. Kaikei's work. It is a work in 1201. Loaned to Nara National Museum.
- Chōgen- Important Cultural Property of Japan. (1234)
- Buddhist saint's mask, 25 pieces – Important Cultural Property of Japan. It is a work of Kaikei's school.

== List of craftwork ==
- Hand drum made of copper – Important Cultural Property of Japan. (1194).
- Gorintō made of copper – Important Cultural Property of Japan. (1194).
- Table – Important Cultural Property of Japan.

== List of paintings ==
- Nirvana – Important Cultural Property of Japan.
- Shingon's eight saints – Important Cultural Property of Japan.

== See also ==
- National Treasures of Japan
  - List of National Treasures of Japan (sculptures)

== Gallery ==
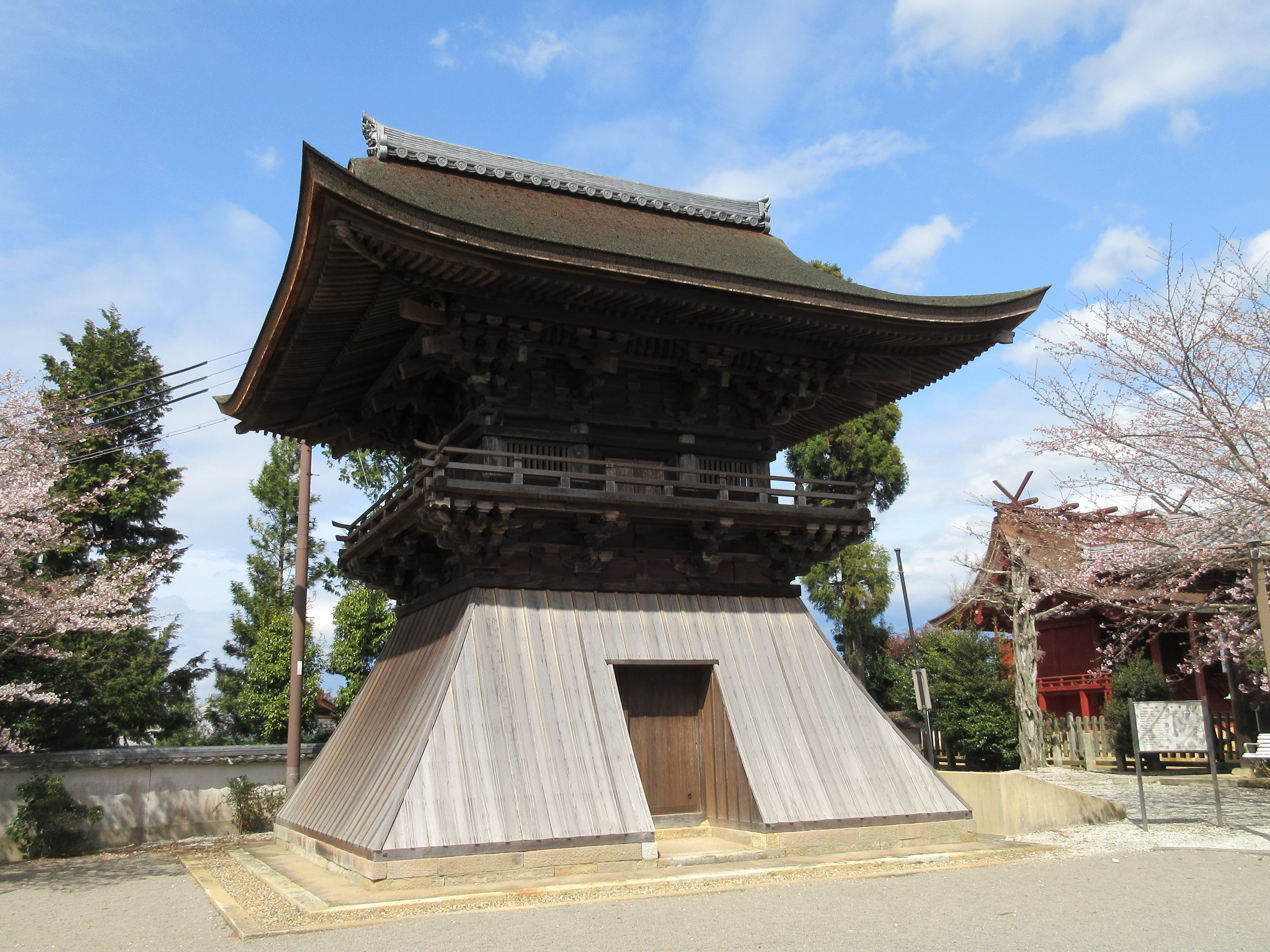
Bell tower

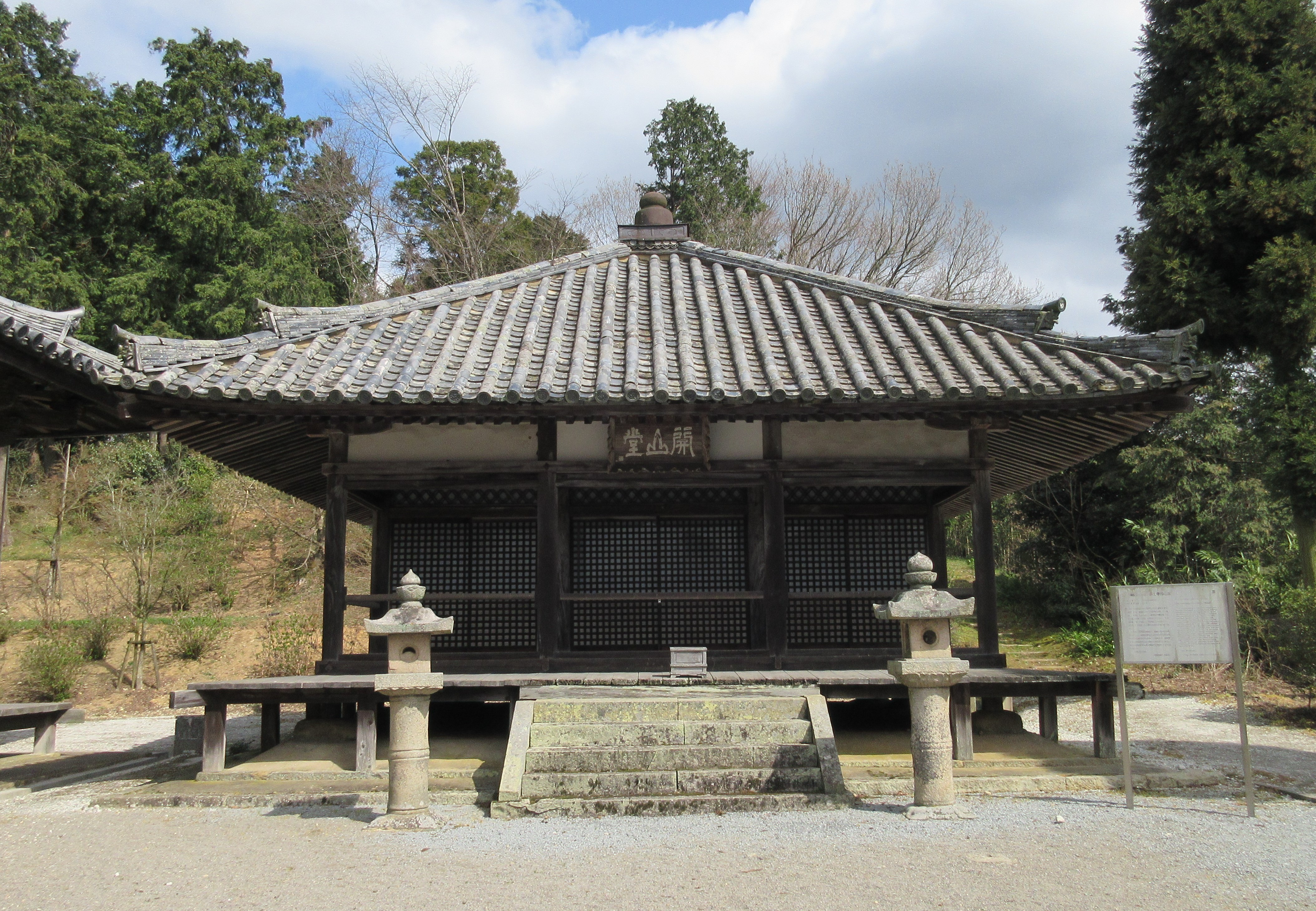
Kaizandō

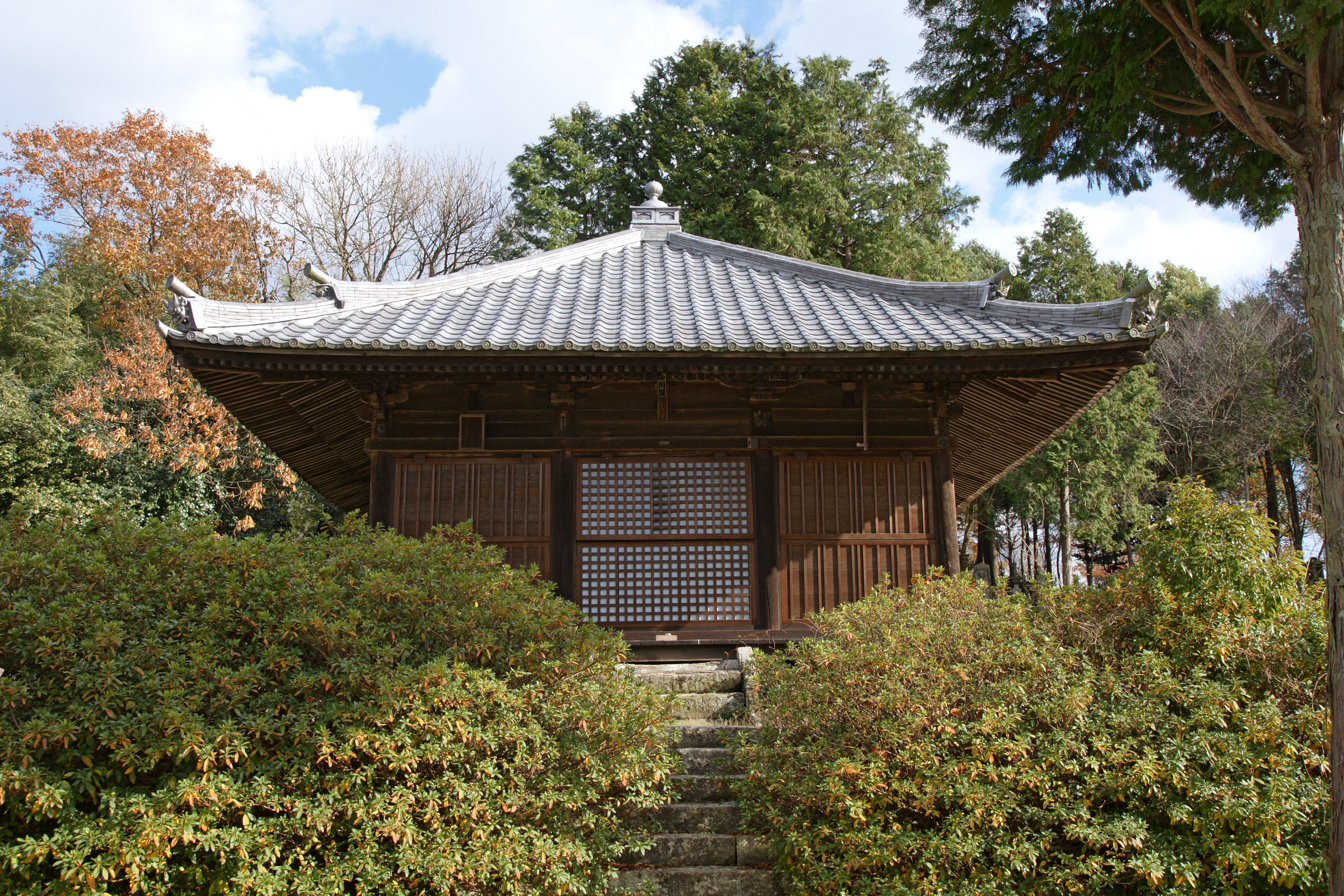
Fudoō

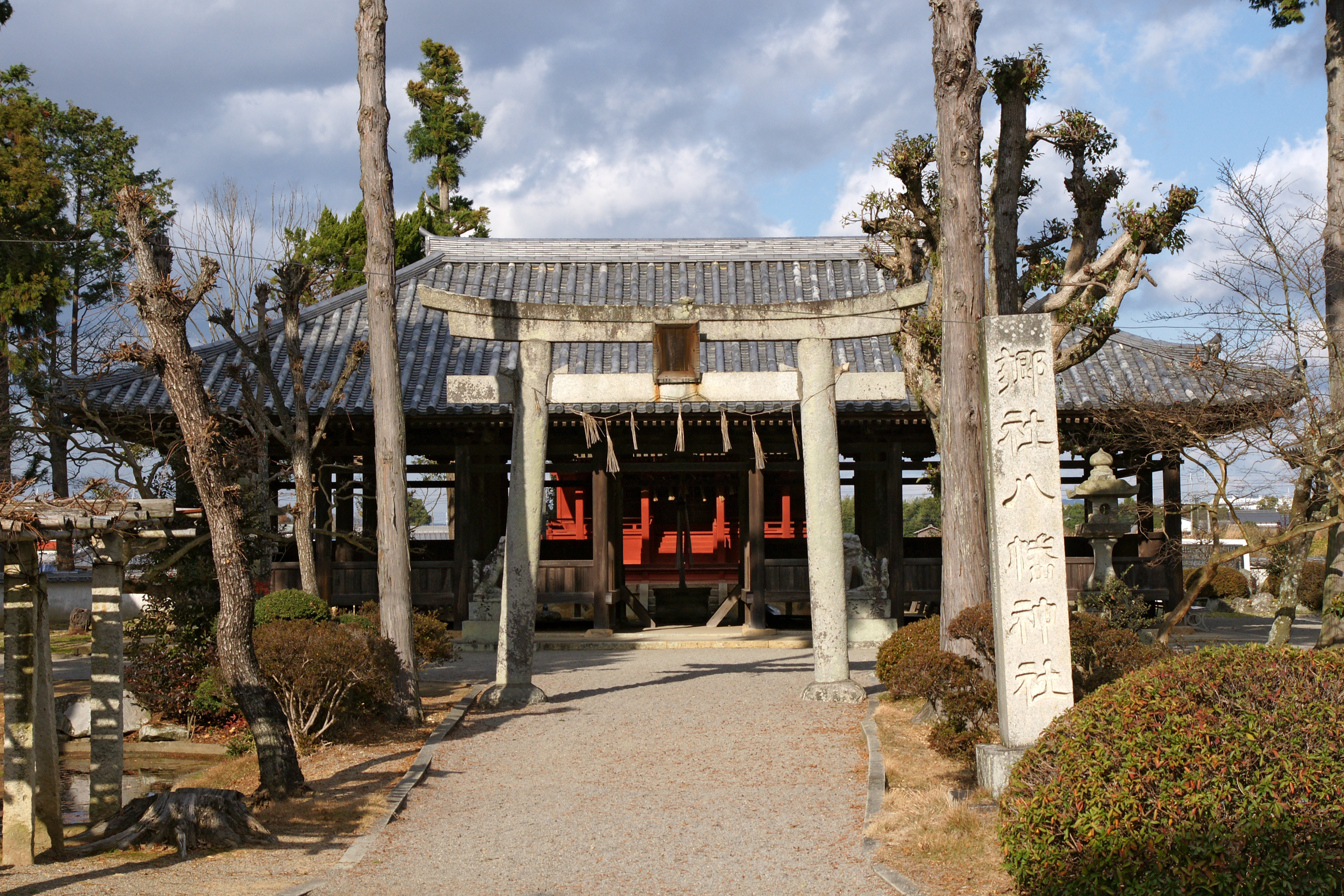
Hachiman-jinja Torii and haiden
