= Kanjin =

Customs of solicitation for donations to Buddhist temples in Japan

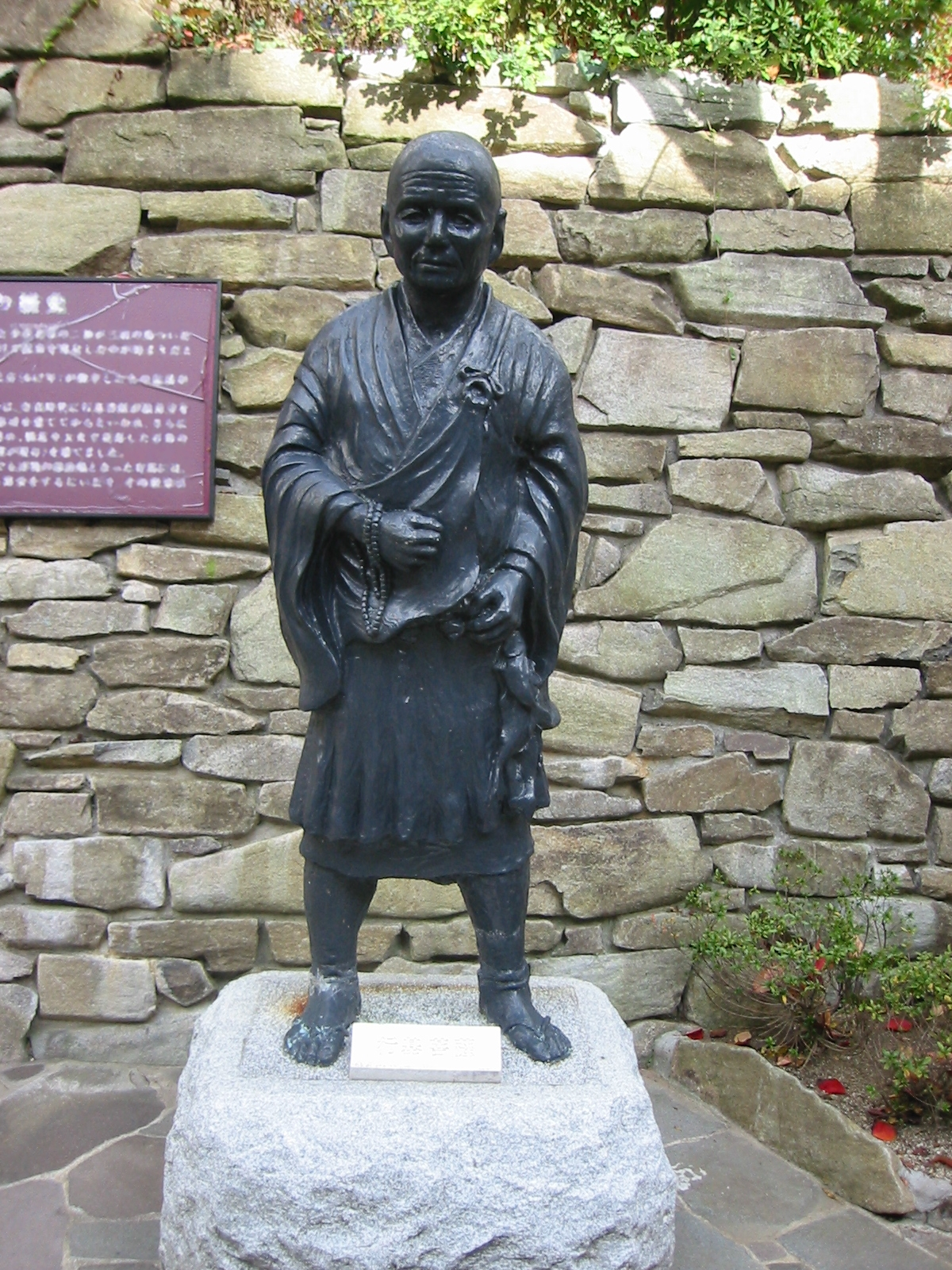
Statue of Gyōki, Kobe, Japan

Kanjin (勧進, Kanjin) (or Kange) ('temple solicitation') is a Japanese term for the many and various methods of a Buddhist monk to solicit donations. It generally indicates the recommendation or encouragement through chanted sutras. Solicited donations are usually intended for the establishment of new temples or statues or their renovations. Since the medieval age, Kanjin has come to mean 'fund raising'.

== Kanjin-Hijiri (Saint) ==
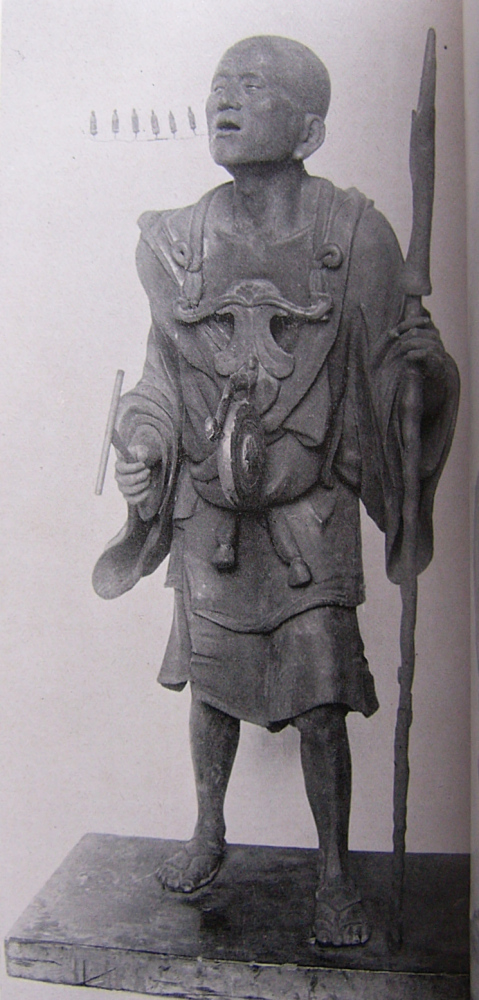
Statue of Kūya who was traveling as Kanjin

Kanjin usually means the solicitation of donations for temple construction or repair. It originally meant the action of monks who encourage the recitation of chanted sutras and who collect donations, thereby spreading Buddhism, but later meant chiefly raising money through fundraisers.

In the medieval age, construction of bridges or repairs of roads, and construction of official temples were also beneficiaries of Kanjin. These public works should have been funded by the governing bodies or local officials. However, those who did the job were Kanjins and they carried a scroll of Kanjin or Kanjincho and traveled in many areas of Japan and collected donations at temples or shrines or checkpoints called Sekisho. The money people paid respectively was very small, as in the idiomatic 4-letter phrase Isshi-Hansen which meant a piece of paper and a half sen (one hundredth of yen).

The work of kanjin was conducted by the monks who were called Kanjin-hijiri (literally "Kanjin saint") or Kanjin-monk, Kanjin-shōnin; they traveled and preached and received donations in money or rice. They took necessary costs and others were used for the original purposes. The most famous Kanjin monks included Gyōki (668–749) of the Nara period, Kūya (903–972) and Engyō (?–1004- ?) of the Heian period. There were female kanjin called Kanjin-bikuni (priestess), including Seijun (?–1566) of Rinzai school who devoted herself to the restoration of the Ise Grand Shrine. Formal recognition of priestesses was delayed because the Imperial Household had not recognized them.

== Popularity ==
The custom of Kanjin became popular in the 12th century and afterwards. The bell of Kimpusen-ji, Nara Prefecture, was founded by the kanjin of Dojaku (?- 1147). The Uji bridge of Kyoto and the Seta-no-Karahashi(Chinese Bridge of Seta), located at the southern end of Lake Biwa, now Shiga Prefecture were maintained by the kanjins in the 12th century. The restoration of Omi-no-Sekiji, a temple, was completed in 1179 by the kanjin of Namua-shōnin.

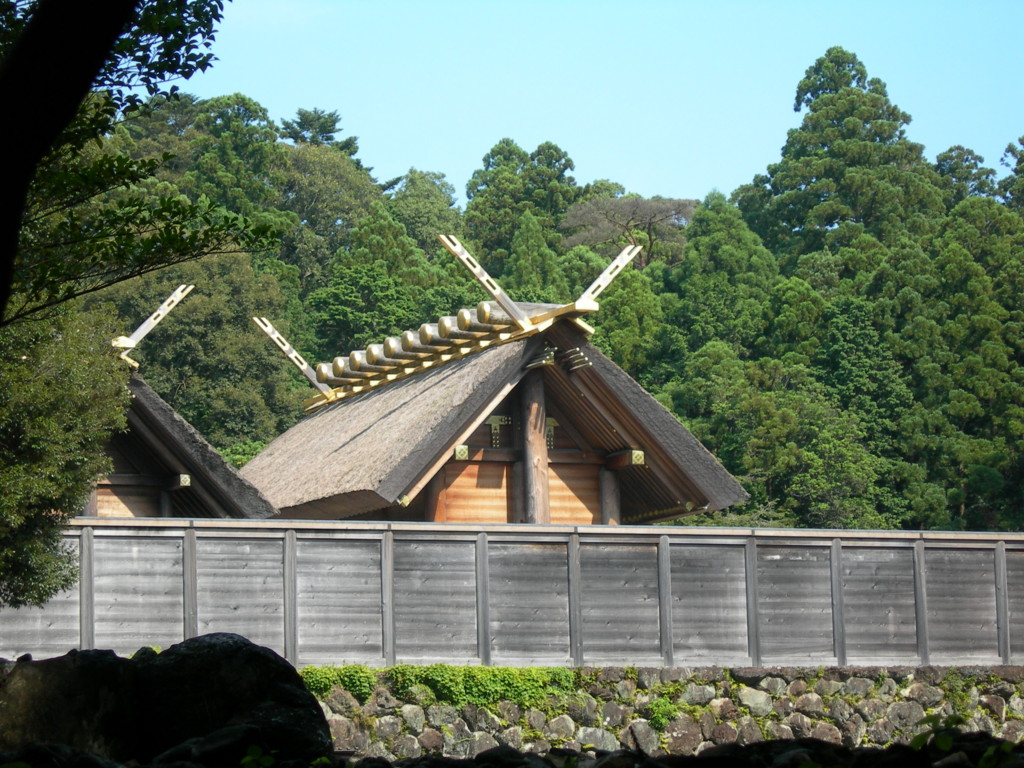
Naikū of Ise Grand Shrine has been rebuilt every 20 years

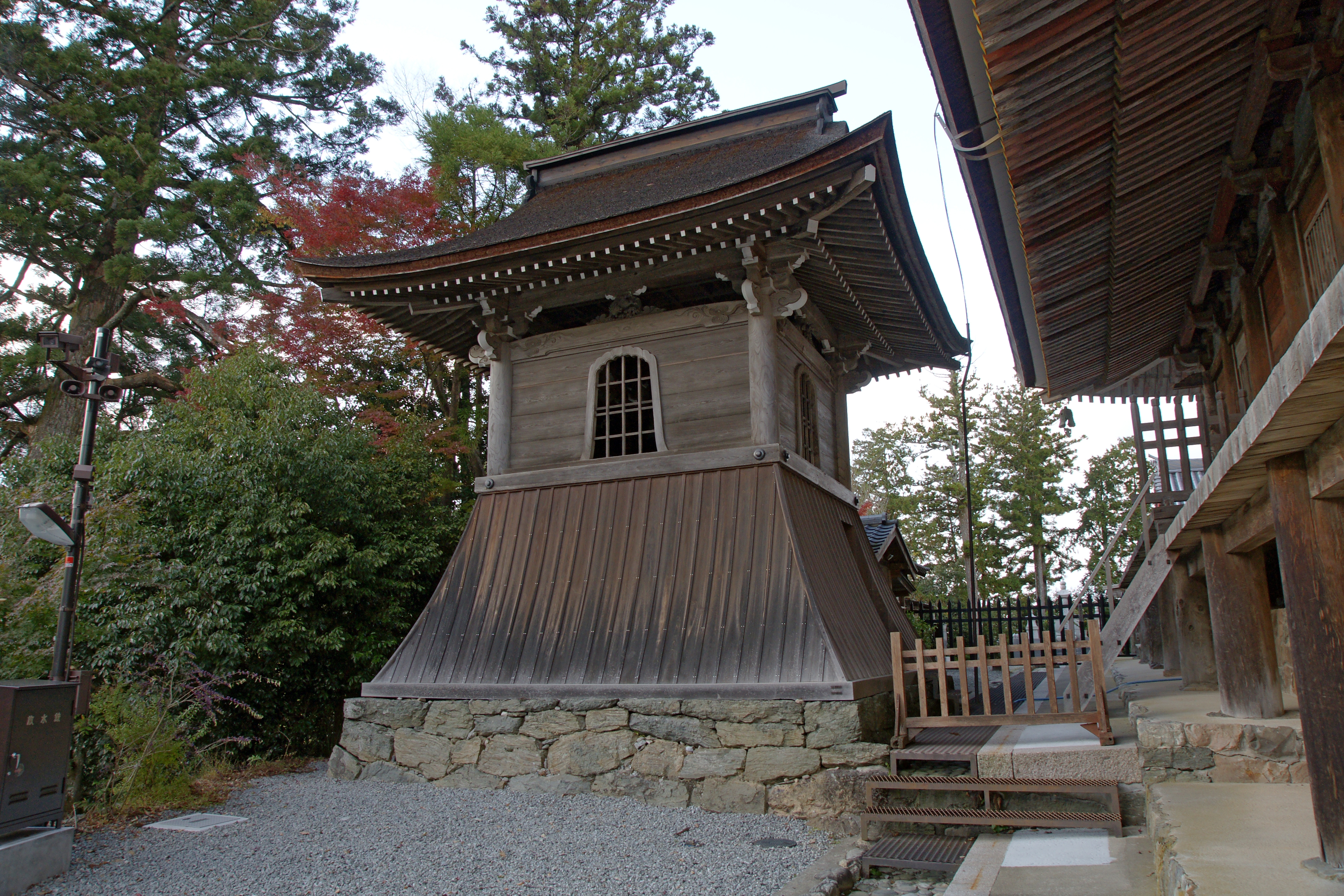
The bell house of Kinpusen-ji, Nara Prefecture. The house was founded by Dojaku.

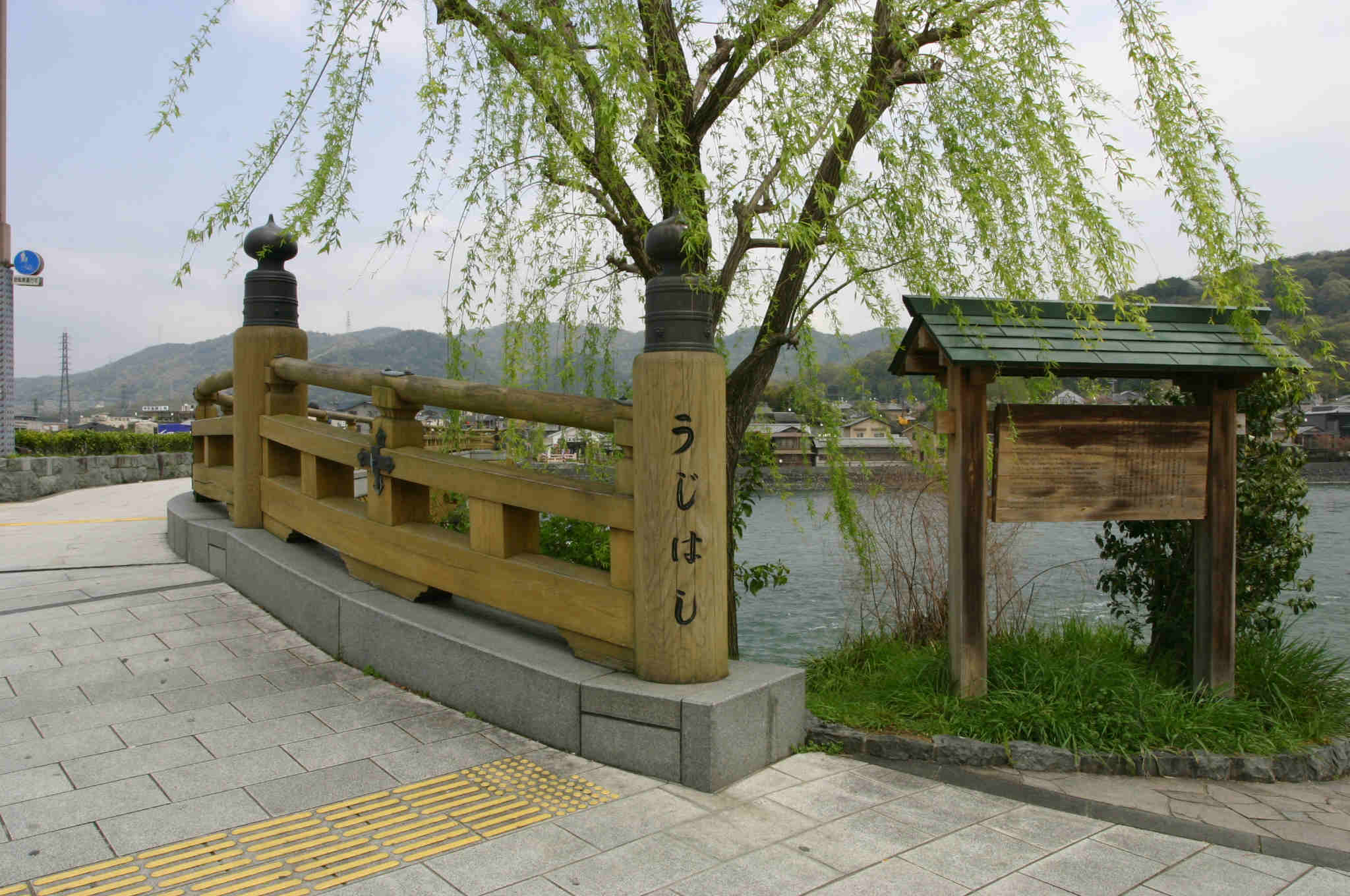
Uji bridge, known as one of the oldest bridges in Japan

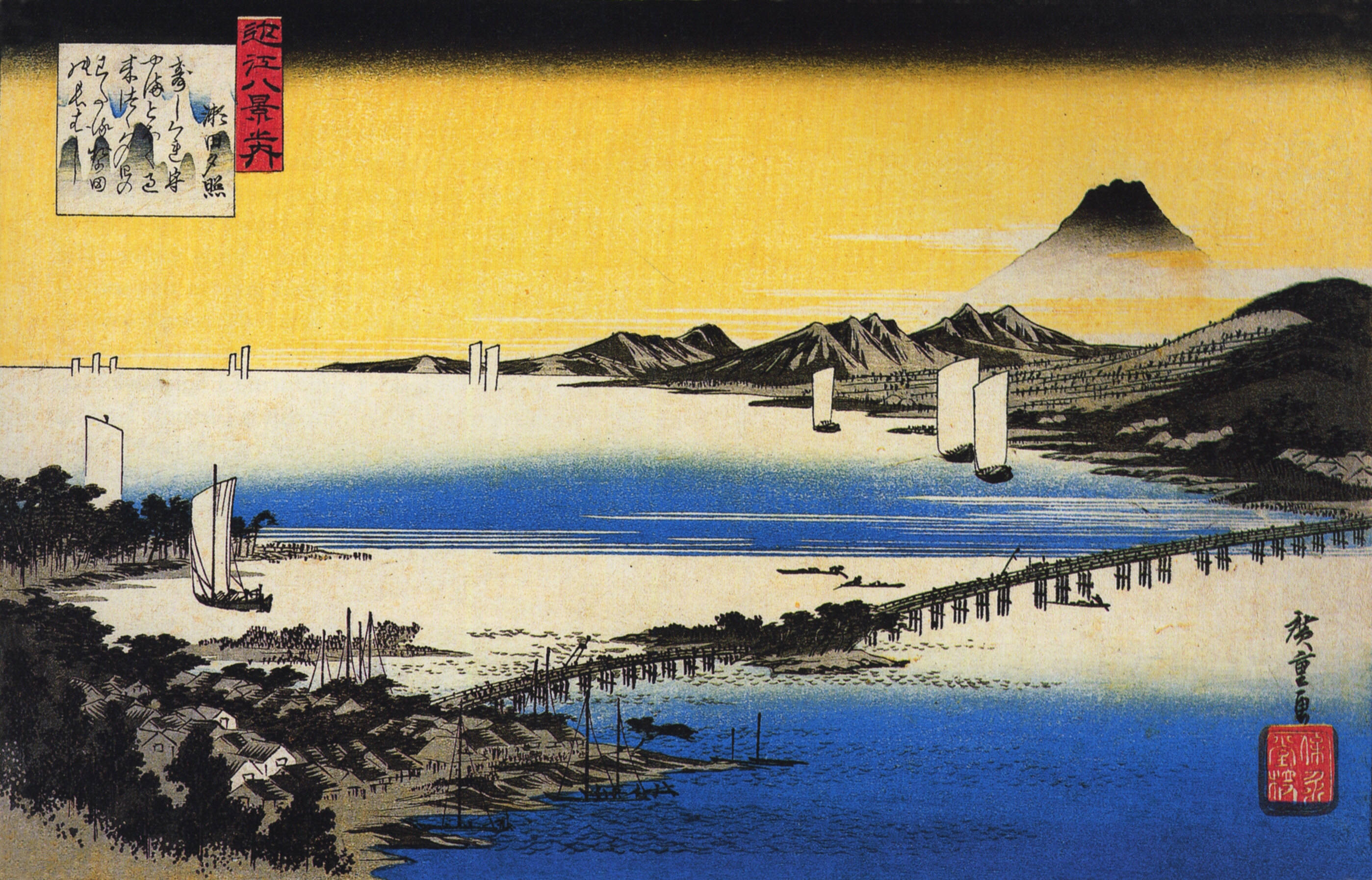
Setano Karahashi (Chinese bridge of Seta), by Hiroshige. It is about 355 metres (1,165 ft) long

== Kanjinshoku of Tōdai-ji ==
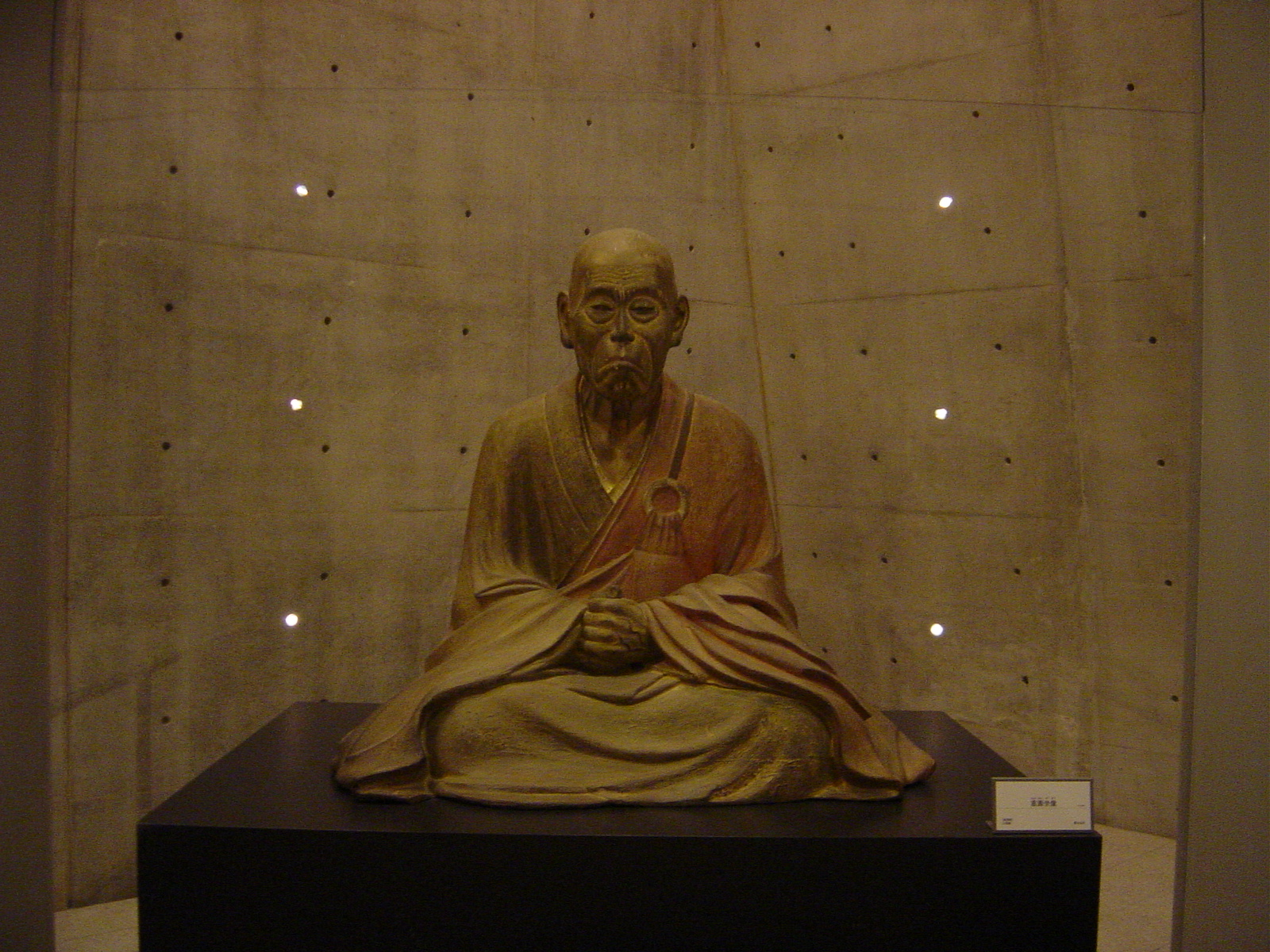
Chōgen in replica at Osaka Prefectural Sayamaike Museum

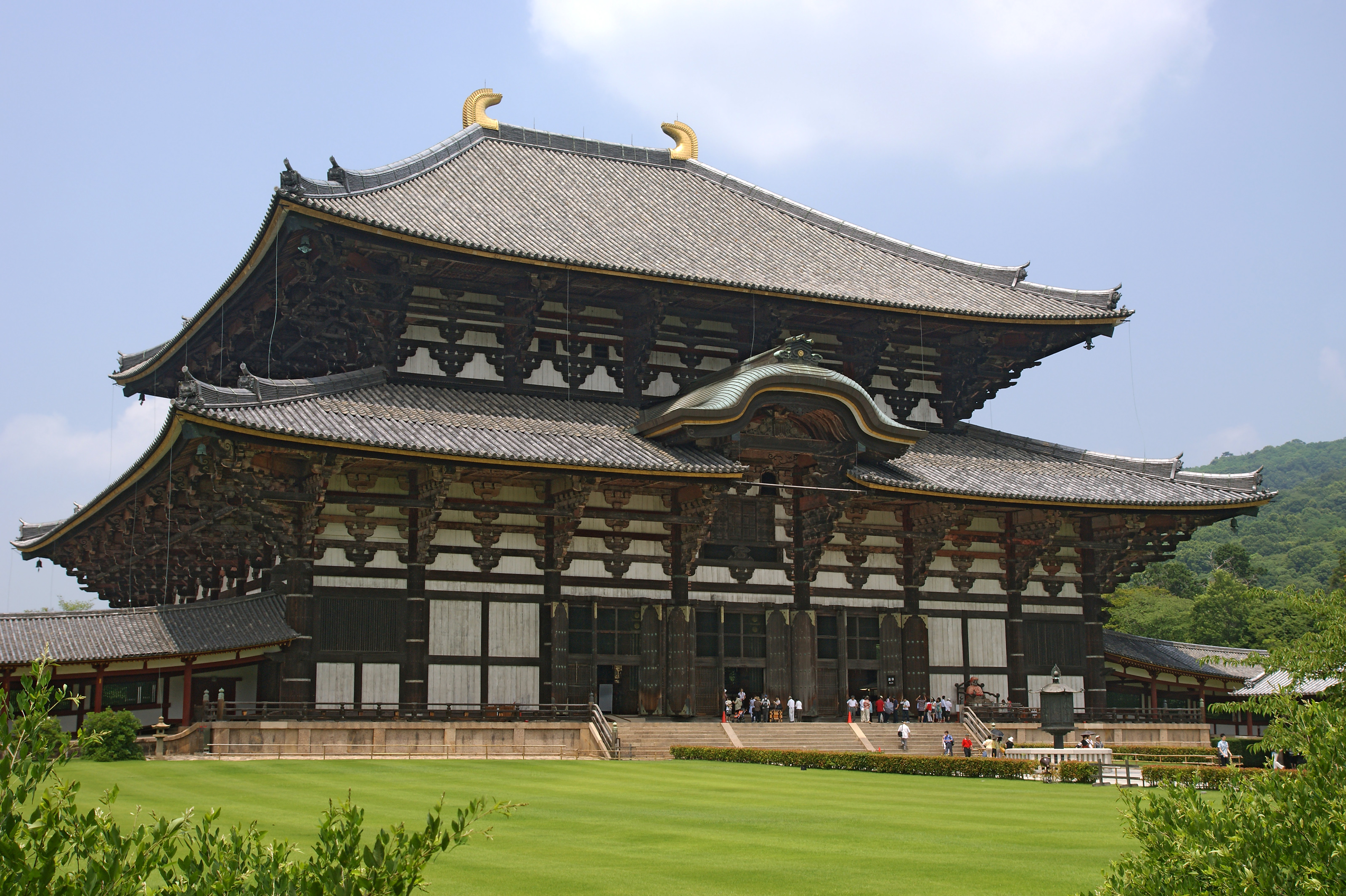
Daibutsu-den in Tōdai-ji

Tōdai-ji, in Nara, which housed the Japan's largest Daibutsu burned down in 1180. Emperor Go-Shirakawa wanted to reconstruct it. He nominated Chōgen as Daikanjinshoku, the head of kanjin shoku in 1181. Chogen recruited various technicians and collected money. He sent Saigyo Hoshi to the Tōhoku region to obtain gold. Tōdai-ji was reconstructed in 1185. The post of Daikanjinshoku of Tōdai-ji continued to Eisai (2nd, 1141–1215), Gyoyu (3rd, 1163–1241), Enni (10th), Enkan (24th, 1281–1358). After years of interruption in the Edo period, Kokei(1648–1705) maintained the Tōdai-ji and its Daibutsu.

=== Summary of the formal Kanjincho document ===
Chōgen had a letter, which he read aloud, for the donations for the reconstruction of Tōdai-ji and the Daibutsu).

I hereby request that all believers in Buddhism provide support for our civil engineering project aimed at repairing the Buddhist statue. This temple had been a sacred place with many buildings decorated with gold, conforming to the desire of Emperor Shomu and the works of Gyōki. This Daibutsu brought profits for several hundred years. However, it was burned down unexpectedly in last winter to our greatest sorrow. The present Emperor of Japan ordered the reconstruction of Tōdai-ji and Daibutsu with all strength of our capital and country-side. If you have a little money, do not hesitate to donate your money as much as you can. Then, our desire will be accomplished. The year of 1181 Chōgen

== Kanjin at other temples and its decline ==
The post of Kanjin was adopted by other temples. The monks of the Risshu Buddhist sect were favored for this appointment since the Risshu sect was unbiased and favored the fair distribution of money and strengthened relationships with the people. However, over time, the post of Kanjinshoku became a post of rights and interests. For instance, Todai-ji was given a district responsible for its maintenance. The position of Kanjinshoku became degraded since some Kanjin-hijiri negotiated with bakufu for their works. Some pursued this post for self-aggrandizement. Kanjin-bikuni (women) were not allowed in this avocation in the medieval era. Nonetheless, Oguni kabuki women joined to obtain money in exchange for sexual favors.

=== Kanjin scroll ===
The original Kanjincho was a scroll on which the purposes or goals of the Kanjin were described. Kanjincho (勧進帳) is a Japanese kabuki play by Namiki Gohei III based on the Noh play Ataka. It is one of the most popular plays in the modern kabuki repertory. The hero, Benkei, cleverly "reads" a blank scroll as if it were a scroll of Kanjin for the restoration of Todai-ji. He does this in order to pass the checkpoint of Ataka, with his companion, who is being hunted by his enemies.

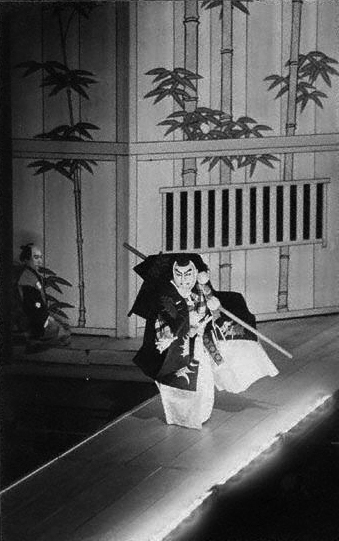
An act of hero Benkei in Kanjincho after reading a would-be scroll of Kanjincho

== Special meanings ==
Alternate meanings of "Kanjin" have evolved over the years:

=== Kanjin Ship ===
A Kanjin ship was a ship or boat on which a kanjin preached for donations, in some boats, people of various amusements were on the ship for the same purpose.

=== Kanjin Heike ===
Biwa hoshi chanted The Tale of the Heike for the construction or repair of temples. It was said that the whole story needed 90 to 120 hours.

=== Kanjin Sumo ===
Sumo had been enjoyed in the Japanese Imperial Household but discontinued in 1174. In the early Edo period, Kanjin Sumo started in order to build temples and shrines, especially in Kyoto, Osaka and Edo. At that time, groups of sumo wrestlers were in various parts of Japan, including Akita, Nanbu, Tsugaru, Sendai, Osaka, Kyoto, Nagoya, Wakayama, Takamatsu, Inba, Nagasaki, Kumamoto and Kagoshima. Between 1648 and 1742, it was banned by the Tokugawa shogunate under the name of violations of regulations. Then, Kanjin Sumo Tournaments were reopened, in Edo in spring, in Kyoto in summer, in Osaka in autumn, and in Edo in winter. The term Kanjin-Sumo remained because sumo tournaments were under the control of the Jisha-bugyō, which was a "commissioner" or an "overseer" of the Tokugawa shogunate. In 1925, the Japan Sumo Association was established, though the practice of Kanjin-moto remains, and expresses private local organizations which hold tournaments.

=== Noh ===
Kanjin-Noh was originally held for the construction or repair of temples and shrines. The noh of Monk Yoshimori was well known for the reconstruction of Kurama temple; he produced a Kanjin-Noh with On-ami and Kanze-morimasa in 1464 in Kyoto. Later, Kanjin-Noh was held for the benefit of Noh players, especially in the Edo era, while the term Kanjin remained.

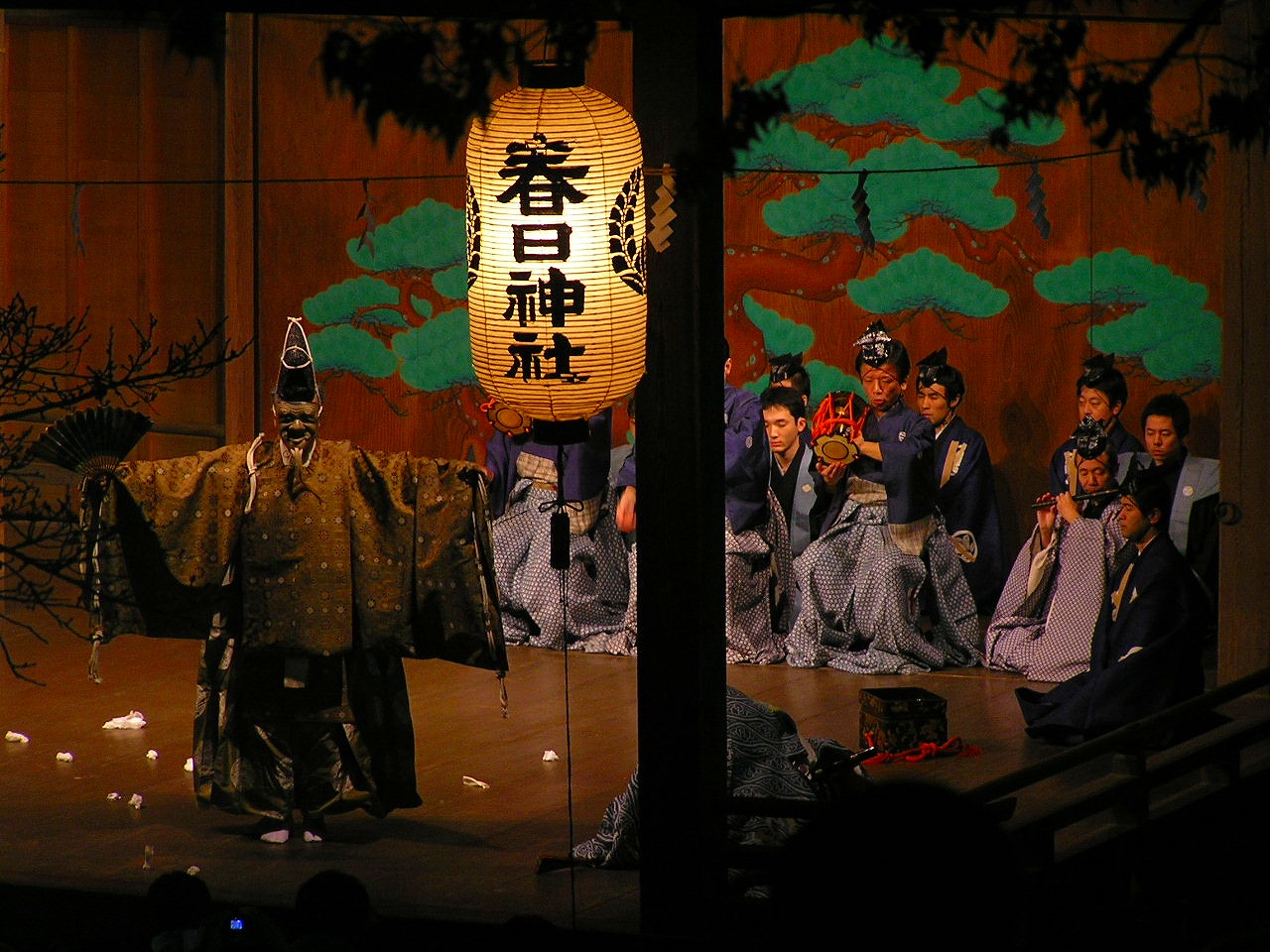
An example of Noh play

Great Kanjin-Noh in Edo Era
Year	Place	School of Noh
1607	Edo Castle	Kanze School and Konparu School
1624	Saiwai-bashi	Kanze School
1656	Sujichigai-bashi	Kanze School
1687	Honjo	Hojo School
1750	Sujichigai-bashi	Kanze School*Longest for 15 days
1816	Saiwai-bashi	Kanze School
1831	Saiwai-bashi	Kanze School
1848	Sujichigai-bashi	Hojo School

=== Dengaku and Sarugaku ===
In addition to Kanjin-Noh, there have been Kanjin-dengaku (celebrations) and Kanjin-sarugaku (decorations).

=== Daikanjin ===
The center of Tiantai at Zenkō-ji in Nagano Prefecture is called Daikanjin or "great kanjin".

=== Begging ===
Simple kanjin indicates begging for materials or money. The Meiji government banned Kanjin and beggars as professions, but in some prefectures such as Sakai Prefecture they were allowed to exist as special exceptions. In the Itsuki Lullaby from Kumamoto Prefecture, kanjin means a beggar; however, this is not standard usage.
