= Statue of Chōgen =

National Treasure sculpture depicting Chogen, Head Priest of Todai-ji

- Japanese: 重源上人坐像 (Chōgenshōnin zazō)
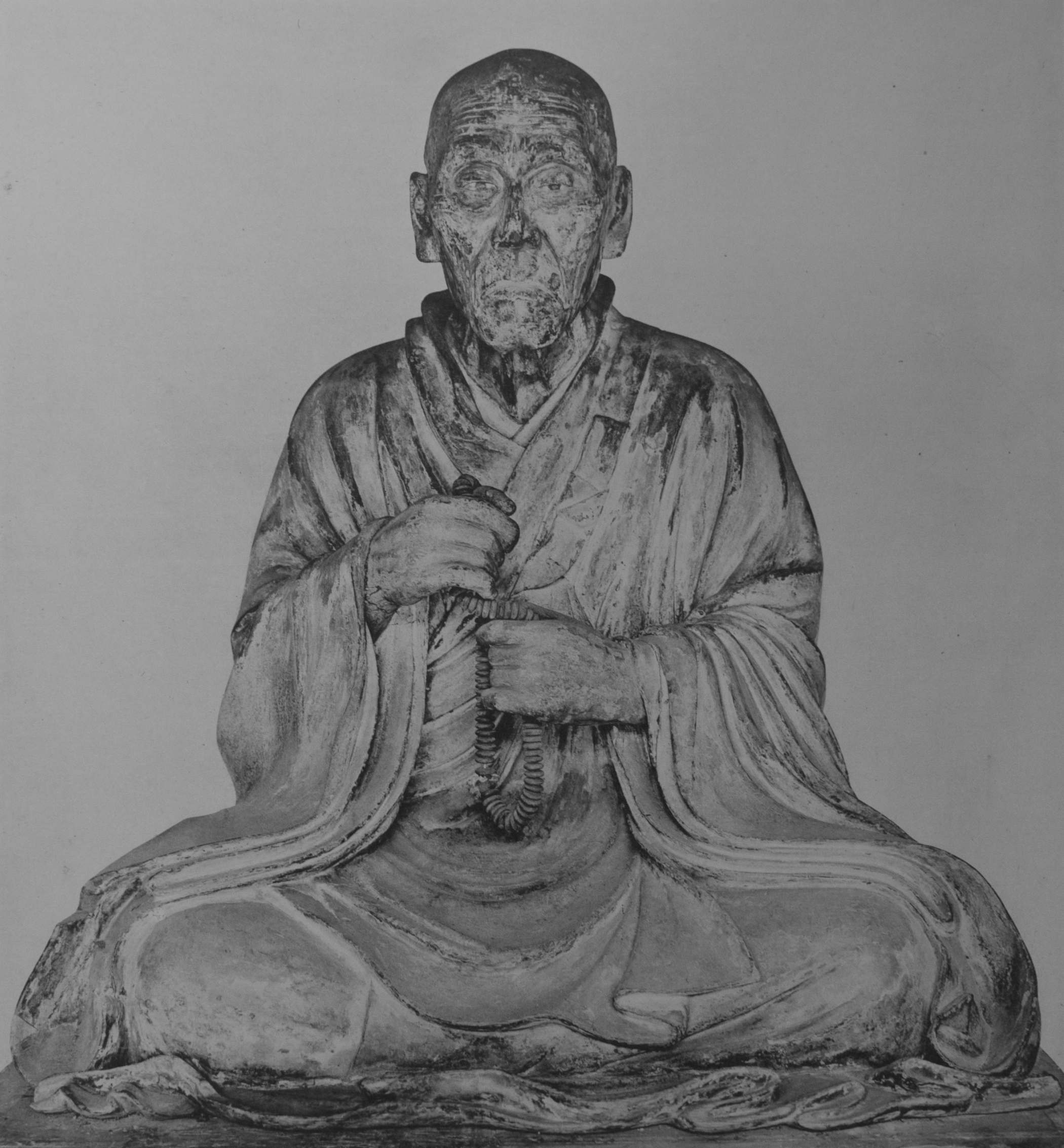
- Artist: Attributed to Unkei or Kaikei
- Completion date: c. 1201-1206
- Catalogue: 00008
- Medium: Wood with polychromy
- Movement: Kei school
- Subject: Portrait of the Abbot of Tōdai-ji, Chōgen (monk)
- Dimensions: 81.8 cm (32.2 in)
- Designation: National Treasure (Japan)
- Location: Nara, Japan
- Owner: Tōdai-ji

The Statue of Chōgen is a 13th century Japanese Buddhist sculpture depicting Chōgen, the head priest of Tōdai-ji in his 80s. Attributed to the artists Unkei or Kaikei, the wood sculpture is part of the Kei school of Buddhist sculpture, which gained prominence during the early days of the Kamakura period in the aftermath of the Genpei War. Recognized for its realism and seen as a masterpiece of Japanese art, it is designated a National Treasure of Japan, and is currently housed in the Shunjō-dō of Tōdai-ji.

== Background ==
Shunjōbō Chōgen was a priest of the Shingon sect, with training at Daigo-ji, who made multiple trips to Song China, as part of the centuries long exchange between Japan and China, which includes the expansion and dissemination of Buddhism.

In 1180, the Siege of Nara ordered by Taira no Kiyomori and helmed by Taira no Shigehira severely damaged the city of Nara. Kōfuku-ji was razed, and the Daibutsu-den of Tōdai-ji was severely damaged, leaving only the Shōsōin intact. At the age of 61 in 1182, Chōgen was appointed as head of restoration under the sponsorship of Emperor Go-Shirakawa and later, Minamoto no Yoritomo upon the defeat of the Taira clan. Soliciting donations, over the course of decades, Chōgen oversaw the reconstruction of the Daibutsuden and the temple campus, commissioning the newly emerged Kei school, whose sculptors which includes Unkei and Kaikei is responsible for many of the surviving images of Tōdai-ji in addition to neighboring Kōfuku-ji, which was overseen by the Fujiwara clan. Chōgen's restoration of Tōdai-ji includes the completion of the Founder's Hall, dedicated to Rōben, the outer Sangatsu-dō hall, the Nandaimon, and the Daibutsu-den in 1195.

As a result of his work, the statue was dedicated to him at his memorial upon his passing in 1206 according to the Genkō Shakusho, though there are theories that the statue was dedicated to him while he was alive at the age of 80. The general attribution of who carved the statues is attributed to Unkei and/or Kaikei, thanks to their close association and restoration of the Nara temples.

The statue, now housed in the Shunjō-dō hall, was designated Important Cultural Property on 27 March 1901. Upon the establishment of the National Treasure system, it was then designated on 9 September 1951, under the registration number 00008.

Normally closed to the public as a hibutsu (hidden image), the statue is unveiled to the public every July 5 and December 16 after Buddhist services from 1100 to 1600. On rare occasions, the statue has seen exhibition outside of the temple, such as the Art Institute of Chicago in 1986, and the 130th anniversary of the Nara National Museum in 2025, also coinciding with Expo 2025.

== Description ==
Measuring 81.8 cm, Chōgen is depicted aged and in prayer, reciting the sutra with prayer beads in hands. The statue was assembled in yosegi style, using multiple blocks of hinoki to form the whole sculpture. Polychromy intact, emphasis is placed on his aged features, with emphasis on his wrinkles, bone structure, sinew, and blood vessels. Chōgen is seen leaning forward in relaxed posed, eyes asymmetrical (and unlike many structures that utilized crystal eyes, Chōgen's eyes are directly carved and painted). Kamakura period conventions of commissioned structure started to lean into realism, of which thanks to the craft of the Kei sculptors, Chōgen's sculpture is seen going beyond the convention towards the hyper-realistic.

Though debates remain whether its main sculptor is Kaikei or Unkei, similarities are noted with the image of Vasubandhu by Unkei (1212), now held in the Northern Round Hall of Kōfuku-ji which he and Chōgen also contributed towards to.

== See also ==
- List of Cultural Properties of Tōdai-ji
  - Tōdai-ji Hachiman - sculpture by Kaikei, made during the restoration
- List of National Treasures of Japan (sculptures)
- Standing Statue of Kichijōten - sculpture with similar claimed attribution to either Kaikei or Unkei
