= Kaikei =

Japanese 13th century sculptor

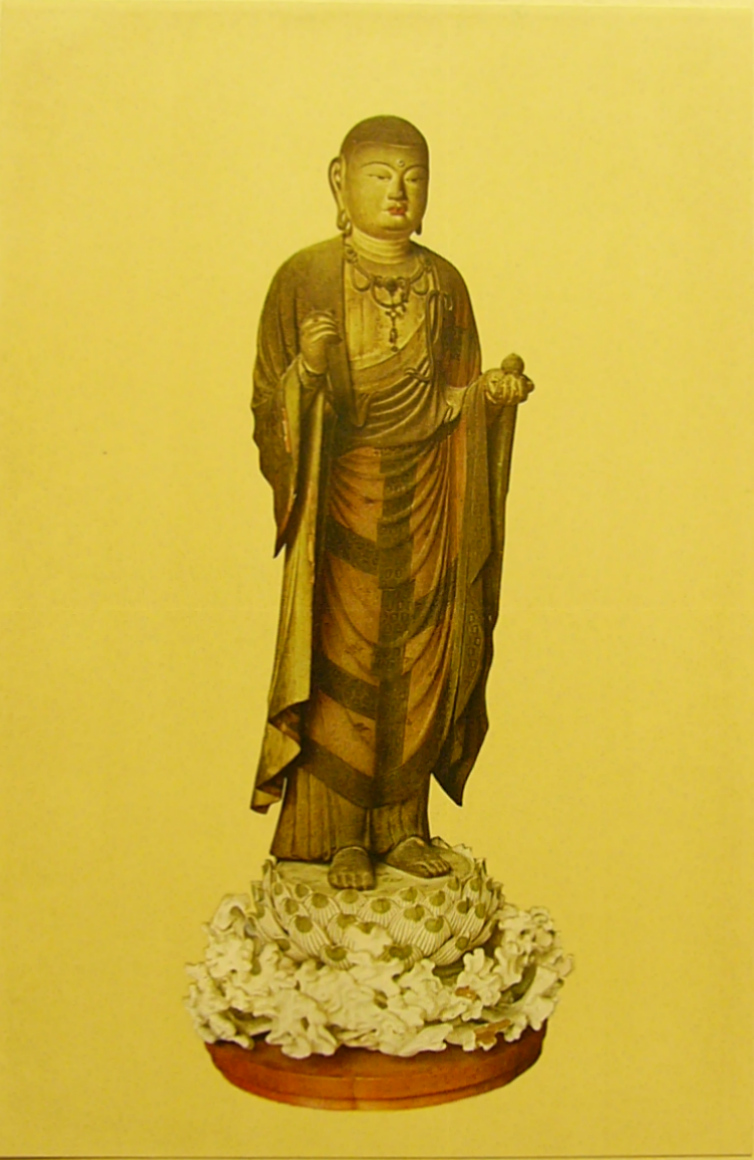
Kaikei, wood-colored Buddha

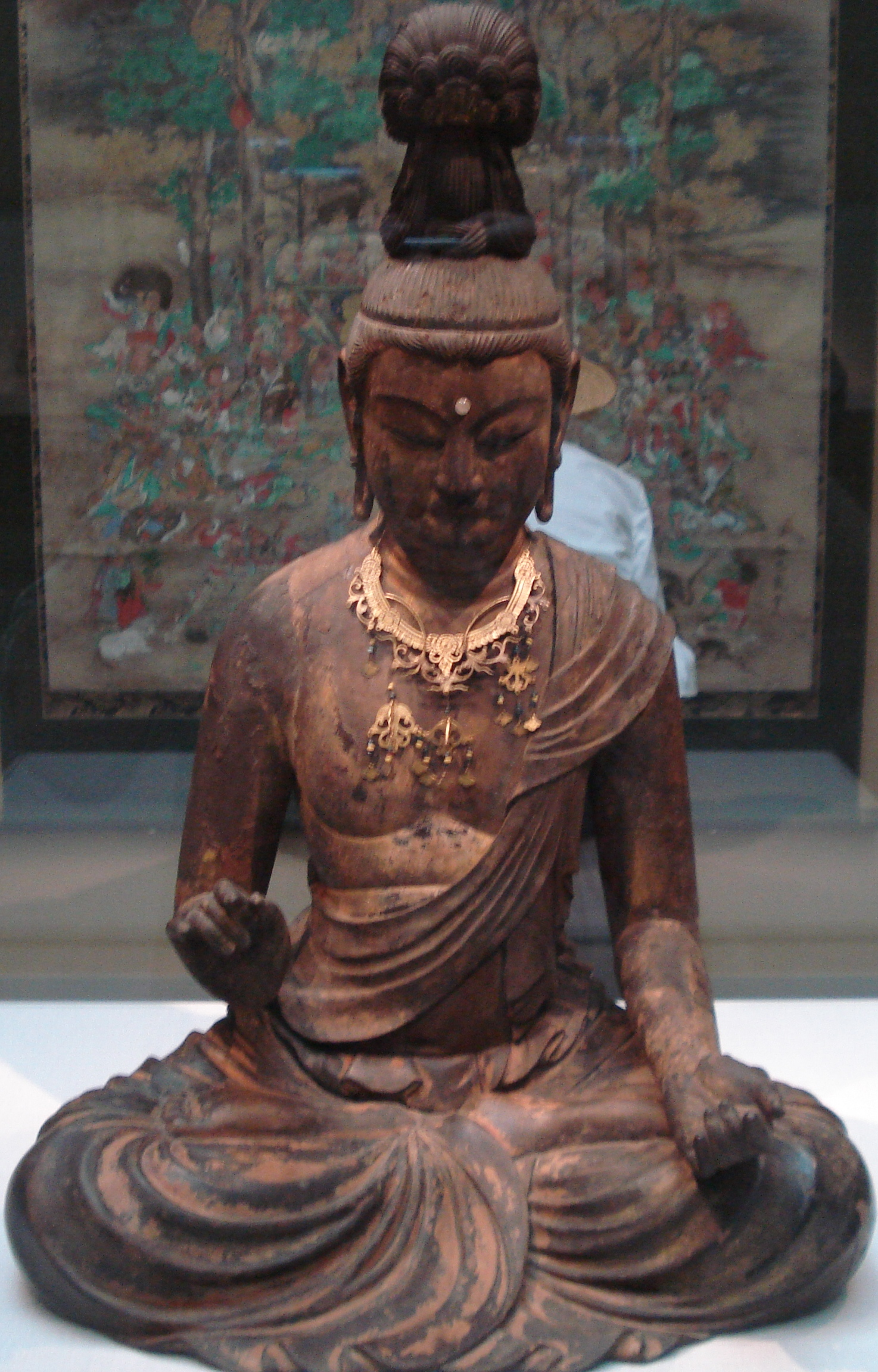
Kaikei, wooden bodhisattva statue with lacquer, gold, copper, and crystal

Kaikei (快慶) was a Japanese Busshi (sculptor of Buddha statue) of the Kamakura period, known alongside Unkei. Because many busshi of the school have a name including kei (慶), his school is called Kei-ha (Kei school). Kaikei being also called Annami-dabutsu (安阿弥陀仏), his style is called Anna-miyō (安阿弥様, Anna style) and is known to be intelligent, pictorial and delicate. Most of his works have a height of about three shaku, and there are many of his works in existence.

== Primary work ==
- Boston Miroku (1189) - Earliest attributable work.
- Amitabha Triad in Jōdo-ji in Ono (1195) - National Treasure of Japan. Most important work. Height: 24.6 ft
- Hachiman in Tōdai-ji (1201) - National Treasure of Japan.
- Burke Jizō (1203) - Metropolitan Museum of Art
- Nio(Agyō) in Tōdai-ji (1203) - National Treasure of Japan. Joint production with Unkei and 13 assistant sculptors.
- Mahamayuri in Kinpusen-ji (1200) - Important Cultural Property of Japan.
- Maitreya in Sanbō-in (1192) - Important Cultural Property of Japan.
- Vairocana in Ishiyama-dera (1194) - Important Cultural Property of Japan.
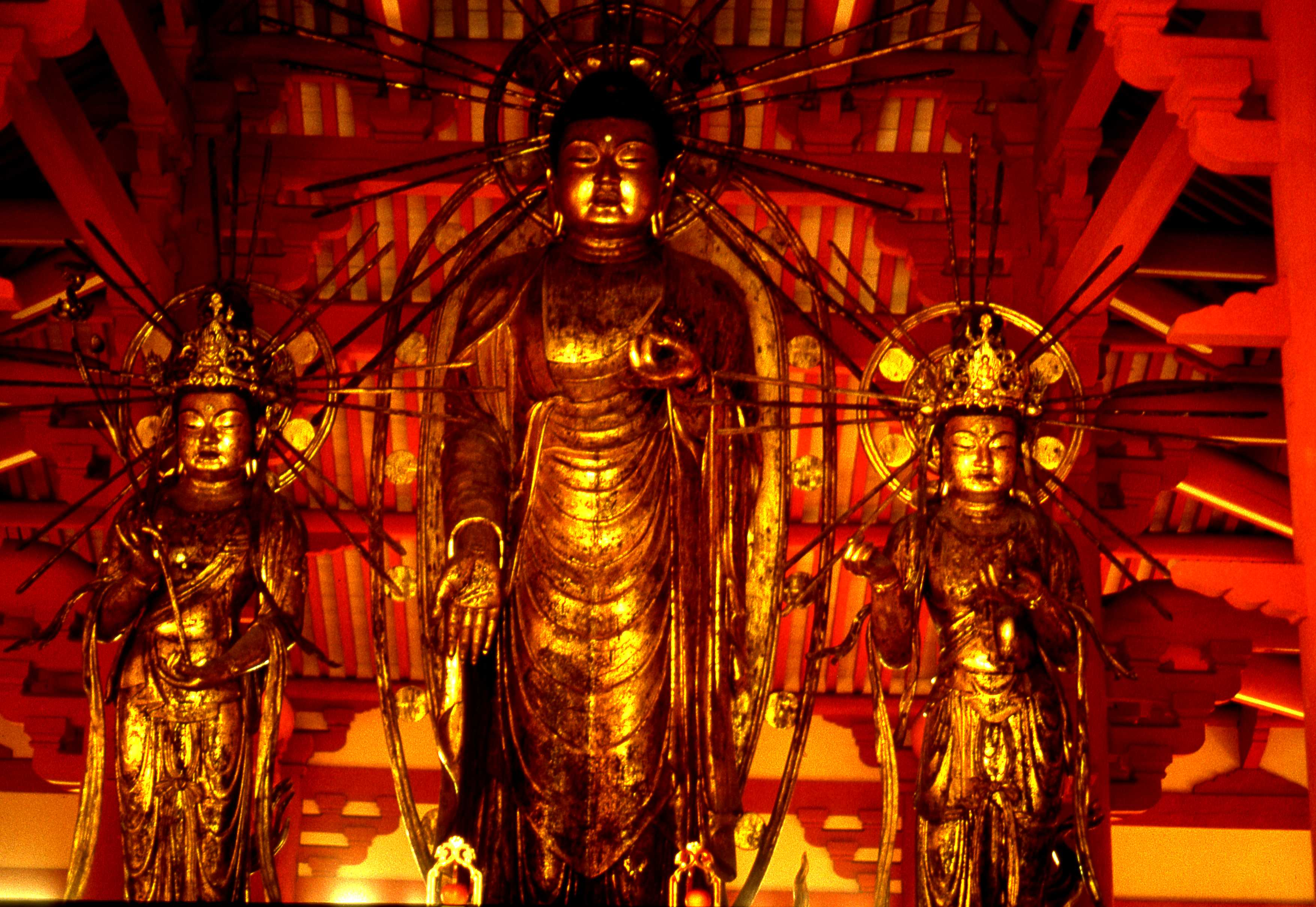
Amitabha Triad in Jōdo-ji in Ono (1195)

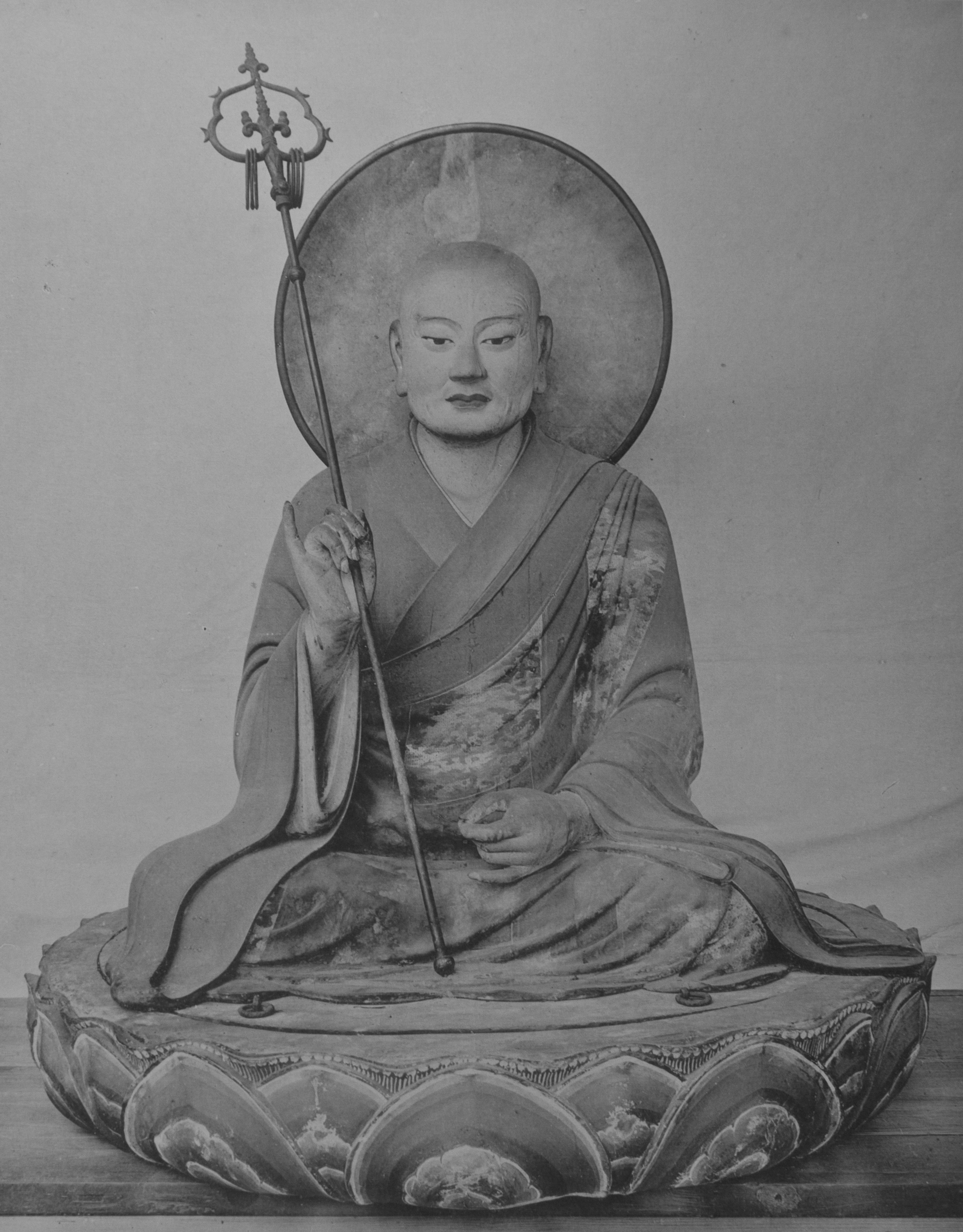
Hachiman in Tōdai-ji (1201)

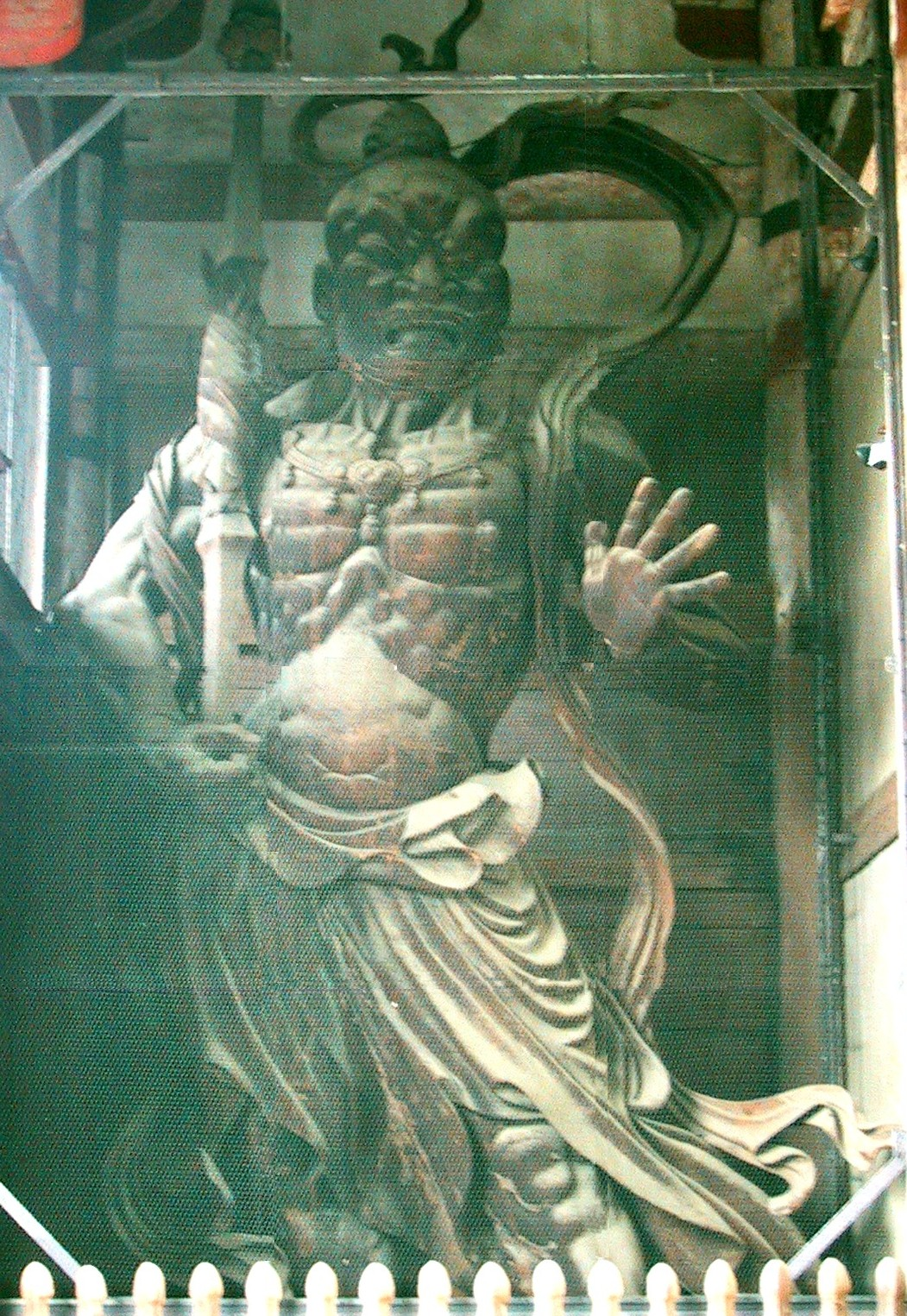
Nio (Agyō) in Tōdai-ji (1203)

== Attributed or Alleged Work ==
- Statue of Chōgen (1201-1206), attributed to Kaikei and/or Unkei, National Treasure of Japan; Tōdai-ji
