= Gyōdō =

Gyōdō (行道) is a Japanese Buddhist ceremony.

== Ceremonies ==
Gyōdō may refer to three distinct ceremonies: ritual circumambulation of temple buildings or images while chanting sutras; masked processions during memorial services; and, in Pure Land Buddhism, reenactments of the descent of Amida. Gyōdō ceremonies still take place annually on May 14 at Taima-dera, where they are also known as mukaekō (迎講) or nerikuyō (練供養).

== Masks ==
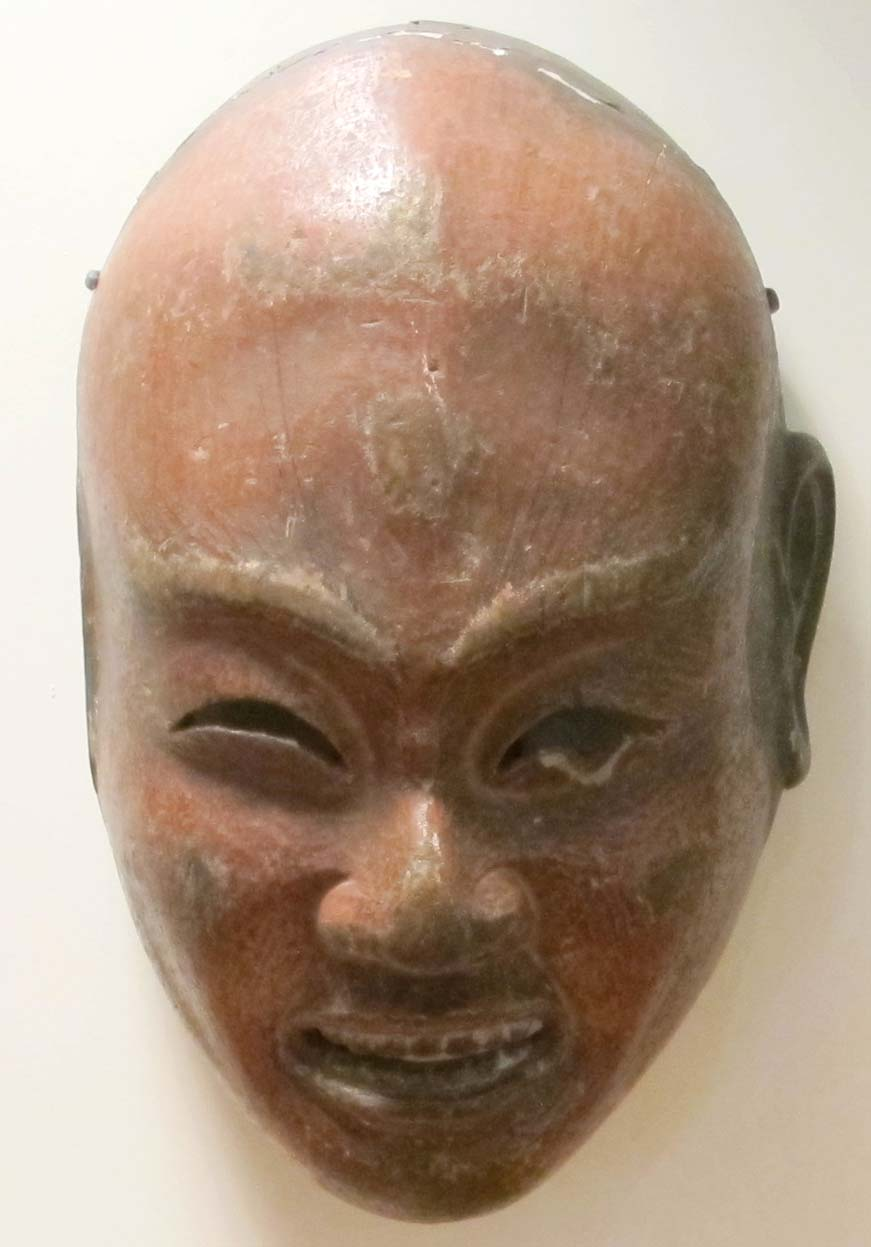
A Gyōdō mask from the Heian period at the Guimet Museum

Surviving masks include a pair of masks dating from 1086 and 1334 at Tōdai-ji (ICP); a set of ten masks dating from 1138 for use in the shōryō-e (聖霊会) ceremonies at Hōryū-ji (ICP); thirteen Heian-period masks from Mitsuki Hachimangū (御調八幡宮) (ICP); a Kamakura-period mask of Tamonten at the Tokyo National Museum; a thirteenth-century bodhisattva mask at the British Museum; a Kamakura-period bodhisattva mask at the National Gallery of Victoria; a fifteenth-century example at the Victoria and Albert Museum; and a pre-modern mask at the Smithsonian Institution. A late-Heian Taishakuten of uncertain provenance was auctioned by Christie's in 2010 for $20,000.

== See also ==
- Gigaku
- Bugaku
- Antiquities trade
