= List of cultural properties of Japan – sculptures (Kyoto) =

This list is of the cultural properties of Japan designated in the category of sculptures (彫刻, chōkoku) for the Urban Prefecture of Kyōto.

== National Cultural Properties ==
As of 1 September 2015, four hundred and fifteen Important Cultural Properties (including thirty-seven *National Treasures) have been designated, being of national significance.

Property	Date	Municipality	Ownership	Comments	Image	Dimensions	Coordinates	Ref.
Repoussé Gilt Buddha Triad 押出鍍金三尊仏 oshidashi tokin sanzon Butsu	Nara period	Kyoto	Chion-in (kept at Kyoto National Museum)	two reliefs			34°59′24″N 135°46′25″E	
Seated Dry Lacquer Yakushi Nyorai 乾漆薬師如来坐像 kanshitsu Yakushi Nyorai zazō	Nara period	Kyoto	Jingo-ji				35°03′18″N 135°40′15″E	
Seated Dry Lacquer Yakushi Nyorai 乾漆薬師如来坐像 kanshitsu Yakushi Nyorai zazō	Nara period	Kyoto	Kōzan-ji (kept at Kyoto National Museum)				34°59′24″N 135°46′25″E	
Bronze Nyoirin Kannon in half-lotus position 銅造如意輪観音半跏像〈（伝稽主勲作）／〉 dōzō Nyoirin Kannon hankazō	Nara period	Kyoto	Oka-dera (kept at Kyoto National Museum)				34°59′24″N 135°46′25″E	
Standing Wooden Kichijōten, inside a portable shrine 厨子入木造吉祥天立像 zushi iri mokuzō Kisshōten ryūzō	Kamakura period	Kizugawa	Jōruri-ji				34°42′57″N 135°52′22″E	
Standing Wooden Kūya Shōnin 木造空也上人立像 mokuzō Kūya Shōnin ryūzō	Kamakura period	Kyoto	Rokuharamitsu-ji				34°59′49″N 135°46′24″E	
Seated Wooden Jizō Bosatsu 木造地蔵菩薩坐像 mokuzō Jizō Bosatsu zazō	Kamakura period	Kyoto	Rokuharamitsu-ji				34°59′49″N 135°46′24″E	
Seated Wooden Unkei and Tankei 木造〈伝運慶／伝湛慶〉坐像 mokuzō den-Unkei/den-Tankei zazō	Kamakura period	Kyoto	Rokuharamitsu-ji	pair of statues (Unkei pictured)			34°59′49″N 135°46′24″E	

== Prefectural Cultural Properties ==
As of 24 March 2015, fifty properties have been designated at a prefectural level.

== See also ==
- Cultural Properties of Japan
- List of National Treasures of Japan (sculptures)
- Japanese sculpture
- List of Historic Sites of Japan (Kyōto)
- List of Cultural Properties of Japan - paintings (Kyōto)
- List of Cultural Properties of Japan - historical materials (Kyōto)
