= Standing Statue of Kichijōten =

Statue of Kichijoten (Lakshmi)

- 厨子入木造吉祥天立像（浄瑠璃寺); Zushi-iri mokuzō Kisshōten ryūzō (Jōruri-ji) (Japanese)
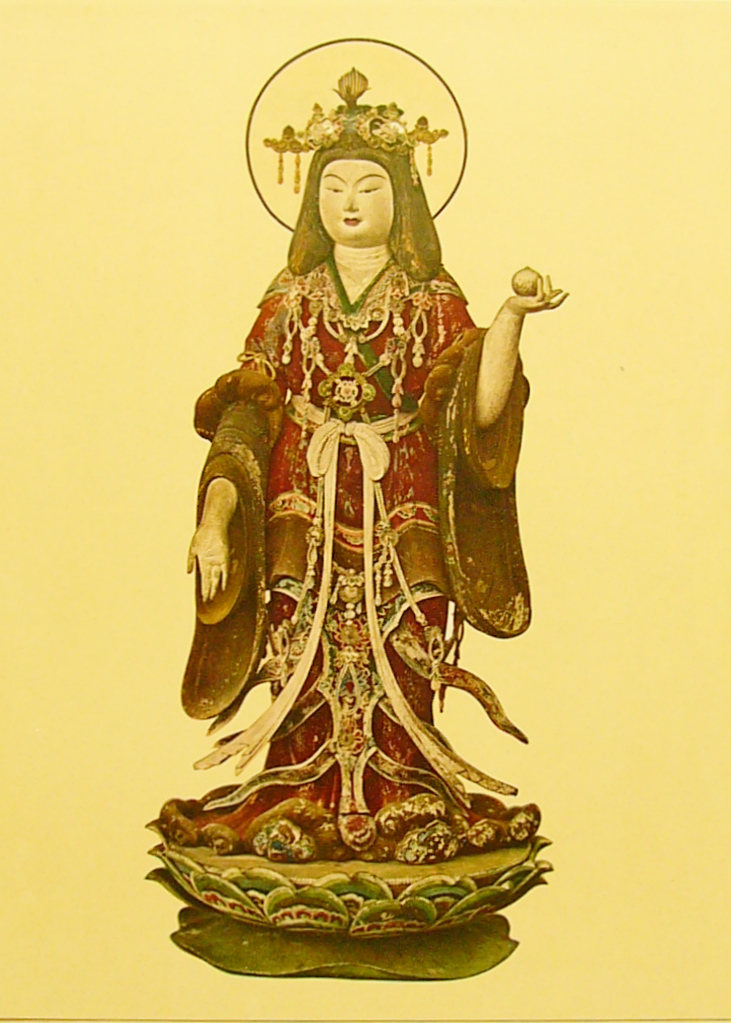
- Artist: Attributed to either Kaikei or Unkei
- Year: 1212
- Catalogue: 01071
- Medium: wood
- Movement: Kei school
- Subject: Śrīmahādevī
- Dimensions: 90 cm (35 in)
- Designation: Important Cultural Property
- Location: Kizugawa, Kyoto
- Owner: Jōruri-ji

The Standing Statue of Kichijōten (Japanese: 厨子入木造吉祥天立像, Hepburn: Zushi-iri mokuzō Kisshōten ryūzō) is a 13th-century Japanese Buddhist sculpture depicting the devi Śrīmahādevī, an East Asian Buddhist manifestation of the Hindu goddess Lakshmi. Housed in the hondō (Main Hall) of Jōruri-ji (National Treasure), the sculpture is classified as an Important Cultural Property and is considered the most representative piece of the deity. The preservation of original polychromy is attributed to the image being a hibutsu ('secret Buddha'), which is only displayed to the public a few times a year.

== History ==
Kichijōten saw prominence in the Nara period as a deity of wealth and virtue, through the Golden Light Sutra. The conventions of her image developed through sculptures and paintings held in Tōdai-ji (746), Saidai-ji, Hōryū-ji (748) and Yakushi-ji (771), in the form of a Tang dynasty noblewoman, with a rich embroidered dress and a plump face.

The sculpture was completed and placed in the Main Hall of the temple in 1212 (Kenryaku 2) as part of a renovation by Jōkei, based upon the temple history record the Jōruri-ji ryūki (浄瑠璃寺流記). The sculptor's identity is unknown, but scholarly attributions have narrowed it down to either Kaikei or Unkei, prominent heads of the Kei school.

The policy of haibutsu kishaku (expulsion of Buddhism) during the Meiji Restoration resulted in the de-accessioning of seven painted panels from the zushi miniature shrine associated with the statue. The municipal records indicate that the temple lost the panels around 1883 to 1884. They were then acquired by the Tokyo University of the Arts (then Tokyo Fine Arts School) in 1889, where they are held today. A replica created by the school replaced the original.

The sculpture gained the status of what is now Important Cultural Property on 18 December 1897. The original shrine panels also have the same status.

As a hibutsu, the sculpture is only on view to the public from January 1st to 15th, March 21st to May 20th, and October 1st to November 30th.

== Description ==
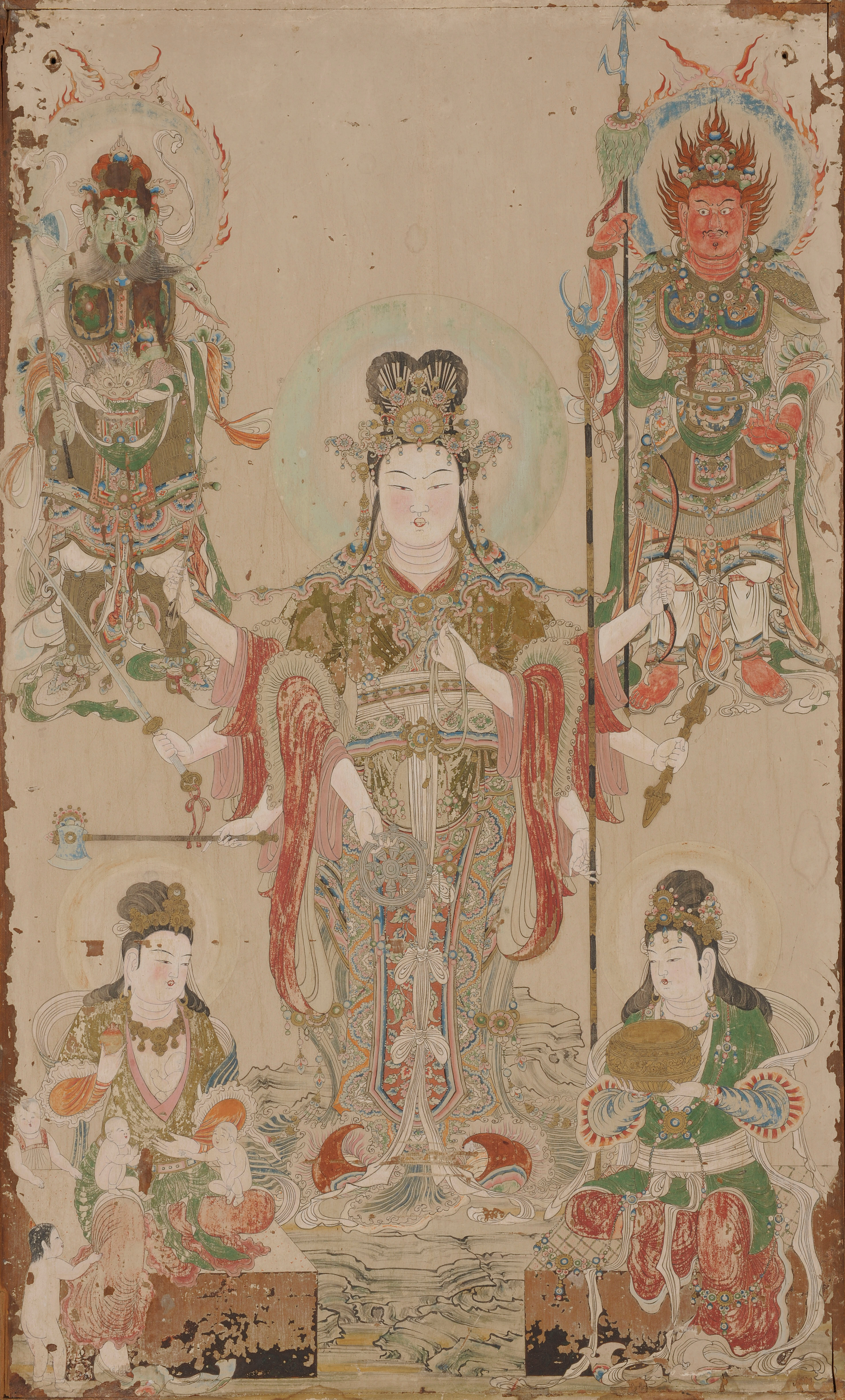
One of seven panels formerly part of the shrine containing the statue, depicting Benzaiten (1212, Important Cultural Property, Tokyo University of the Arts)

Measuring 90 cm (35 in) high, Kichijōten is rendered in the dress of a Tang dynasty Chinese noblewoman, in polychromy, and carved from hinoki, and stored in a small shrine next to nine large Heian period sculptures of Amitābha, designated National Treasure. Her right hand is positioned in the varadamudra (wish granting), with the raised left hand holding a hōju, a wish fulfilling jewel. The statue utilizes a combination of realist features, as well as a stylistic approach that manifests with evenly spaced folds of the dress, and symmetrical placement of the knee-coverings and ribbon around the waist.

The shrine that encases the sculpture is composed of seven panels depicting the Four Heavenly Kings and other entities derived from the Hindu pantheon: Benzaiten (Saraswati), Taishakuten, Bonten (Brahma), Jikokuten, Zochoten, Komokuten, and Tamonten. The panel depicting Benzaiten is accompanied by four attendants: Kareiteimo (safe childbirth), Kenrojishin (earth), and two male guardians, Hōkentaishō and Shōryōchitaishō.

The sculpture and shrine combine the artistic styles of the Tang, the Tenpyō period, as well as the more contemporary adaptation of Song dynasty and Kamakura period art.

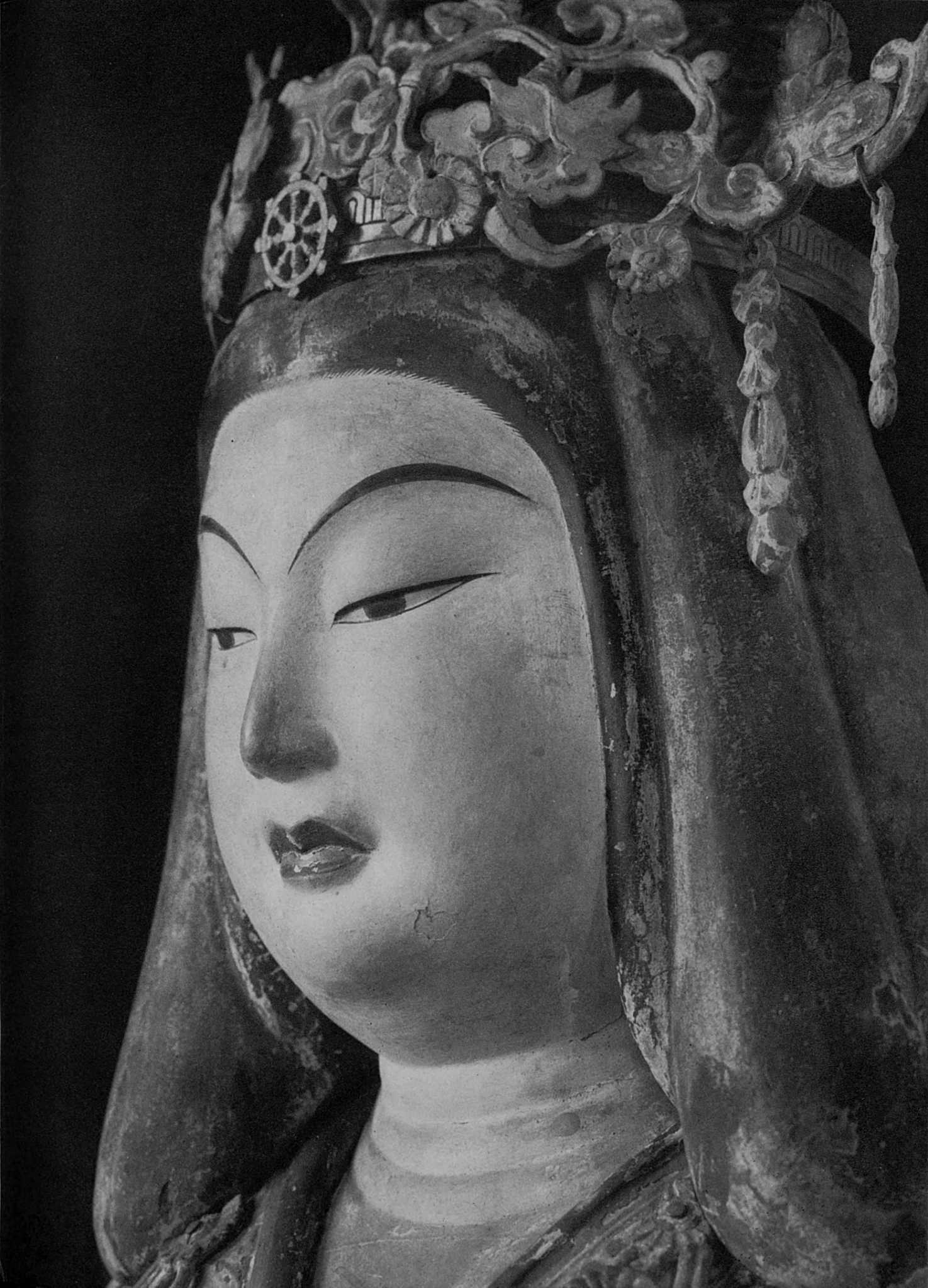
Close-up by Ken Domon, 1952

Photographer Ken Domon recognized the sculpture as the "most perfect depiction of feminine beauty among all the Buddhist images in Japan" and frequently took pictures of it during his career. Photographer Muda Tomohiro describes the statue evoking a "selfless love and compassion of a mother for her children".

=== Attribution ===
Though the sculptor of the statue remains unknown, scholarship has narrowed down the attribution to either Kaikei or Unkei of the Kei school style of Kamakura sculpture.

Attribution to Kaikei stems from his Anna-miyō (安阿弥様, Anna style), defined by his characteristic usage of realistic expression, which manifests on Kichijōten in the form of elegant expression, dimples, and neatly folded clothing. Contemporary works such as an Amida triad at Jōdo-ji, and sculptures at Tōdai-ji indicates Kaikei's skill in integrating Nara-style and Song influences into his work. Additionally, Kaikei and Jōkei fostered a close relationship through eye-opening ceremonies at the sites, as well as a statue commissioned in 1212, recorded in Jōkei's Myōhonsho.

Attribution to Unkei has been based on similarities with a Taishakuten statue at Takisan-ji in Aichi Prefecture, though further investigation is warranted.

== See also ==
- Statue of Chōgen: National Treasure sculpture of Chōgen with debated attribution to Unkei and Kaikei
