= Jōruri-ji =

Buddhist temple in Kyoto Prefecture, Japan

- 浄瑠璃寺
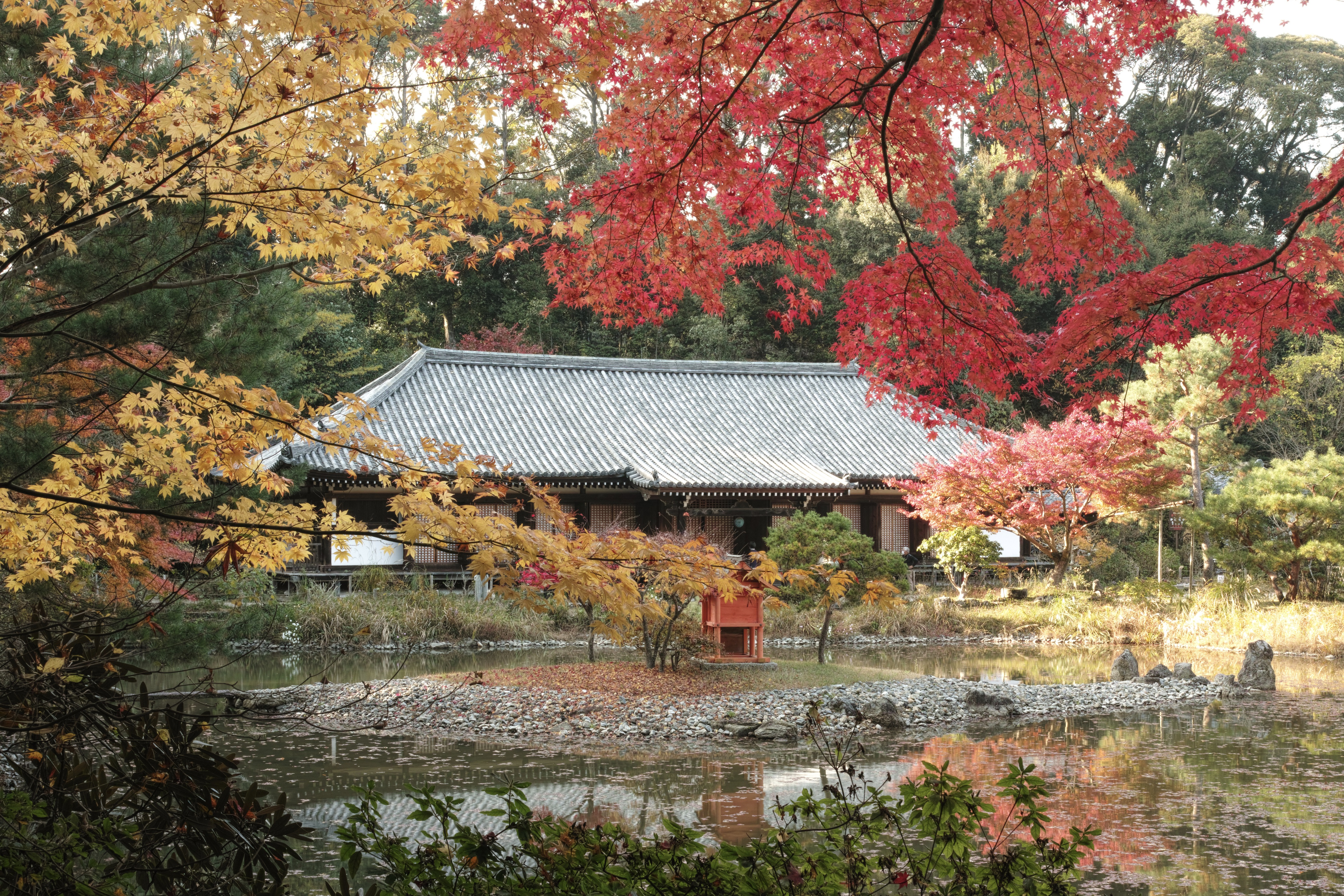
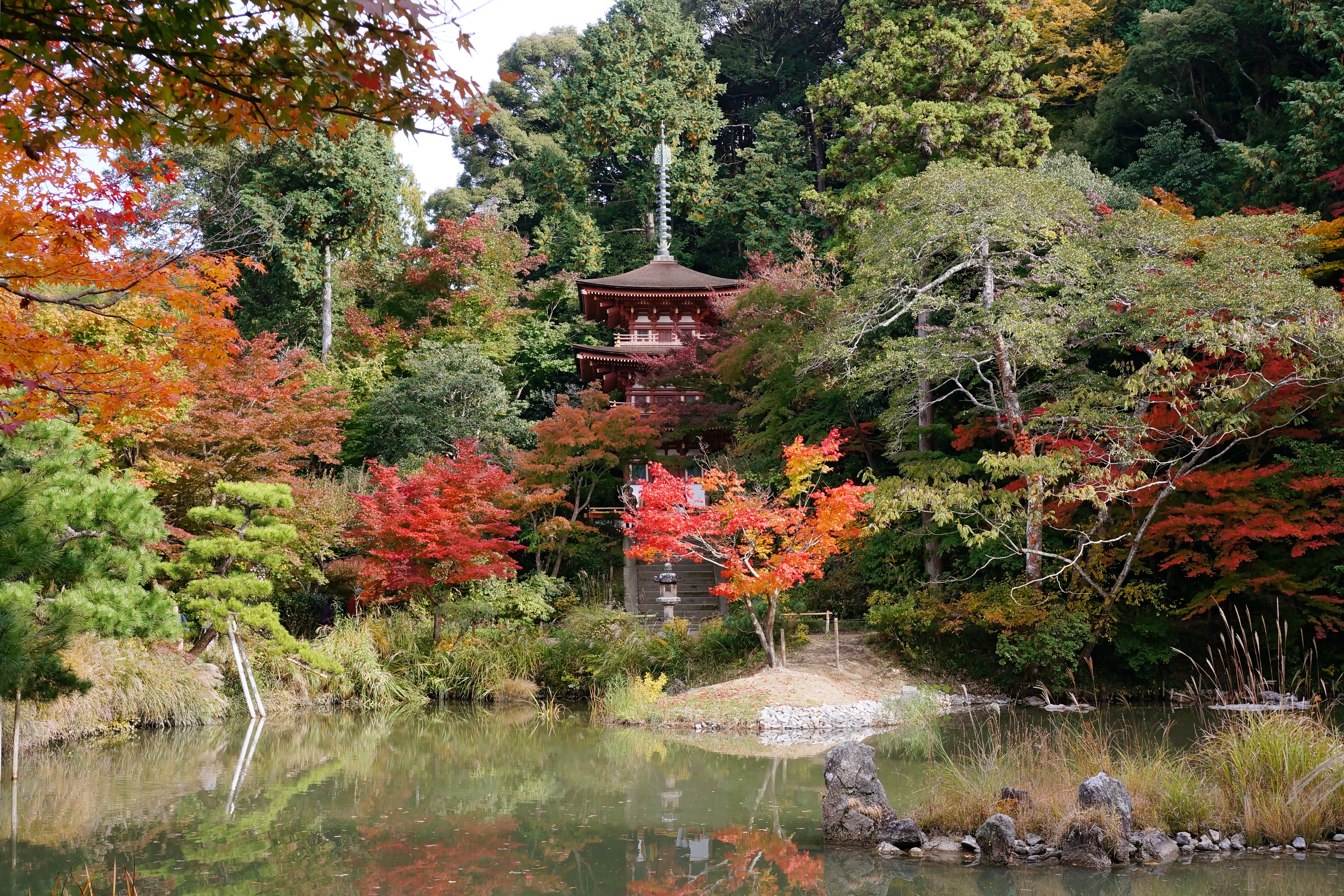
- Main Hall (NT) Three-story Pagoda (NT)

- Jōruri-ji Jōruri-ji (Japan)

Religion
- Affiliation: Buddhist
- Deity: Nine images of Amida Nyorai (Amitābha); Yakushi Nyorai (Bhaiṣajyaguru) (Important Cultural Property)
- Rite: Shingon Ritsu

Location
- Location: 40 Nishio Futaba, Kamo-chō, Kizugawa-shi, Kyoto-fu
- Country: Japan
- Coordinates: 34°42′57″N 135°52′22″E

Architecture
- Founder: Gimyō Shōnin
- Completed: 1047
- National Treasure Important Cultural Property Special Place of Scenic Beauty National Historic Site of Japan

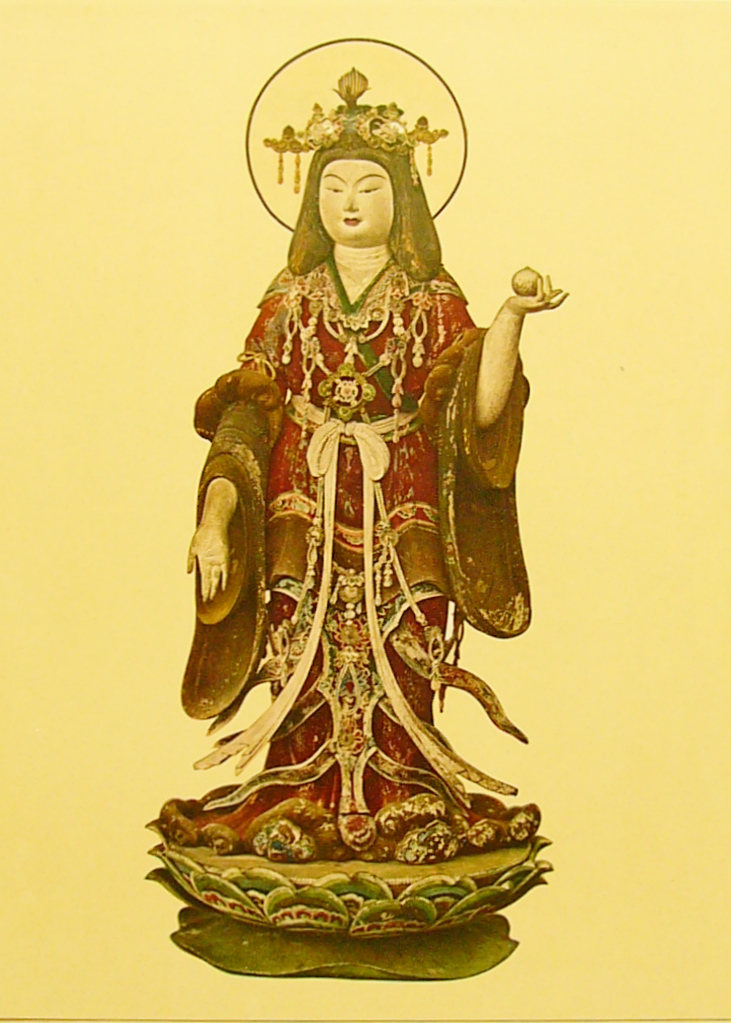
Kissyoten

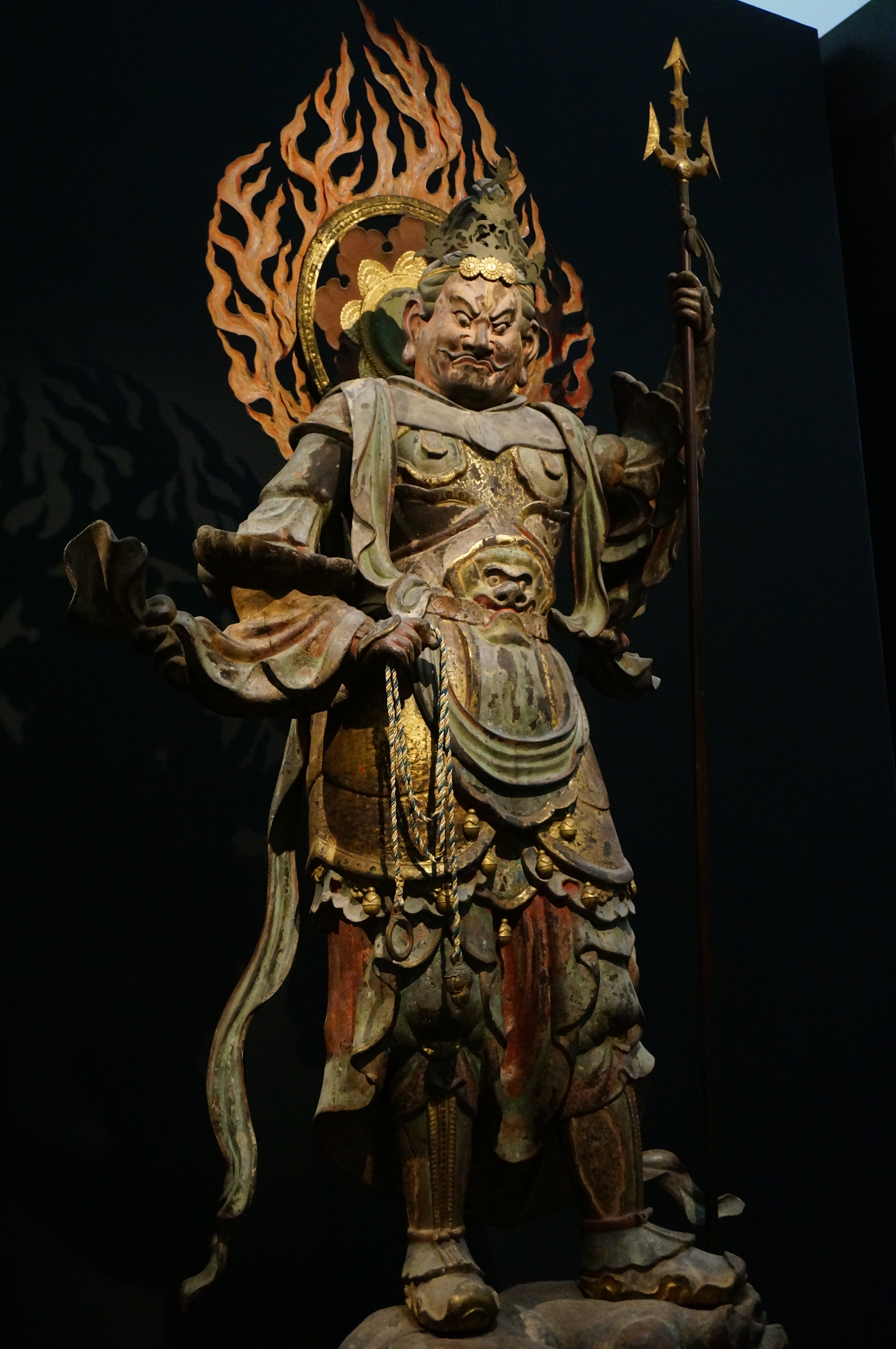
Koumokuten, part of the National Treasure group of Four Heavenly Kings

Jōruri-ji (浄瑠璃寺) is a Buddhist temple located in the Nishio Futaba, Kamo-cho neighborhood of the city of Kizugawa, Kyoto Prefecture, Japan. It belongs to the Shingon Ritsu school and has both Amida Nyorai and Yakushi Nyorai as its honzon. The temple is commonly known as Kutai-ji (九体寺) because nine statues of Amida Nyorai are enshrined in the main hall, and it was also called Nishi-Odawara-dera (西小田原寺) in the past. The temple is heavily influenced by Pure Land thought. It is one of the few remaining examples of a Paradise Garden of the early Heian period. The three-storied pagoda, the main hall, the group of nine sitting Amida Nyorai statues and the group of Four Heavenly Kings are all designated as National Treasures.

== History ==
The foundations of Jōruri-ji are uncertain. There are several theories, including one that it was founded by Gyōki at the request of Emperor Shōmu in 739, and another that it was founded by Tada Mitsunaka during the Tengen era (978–983), but neither theory is supported by any documentary evidence. The only historical document about the founding of Jōruri-ji is the Jōruriji Rukinokoto (浄瑠璃寺流記事), which has been handed down at the temple. This document is a bullet-point record about matters related to the history of the temple and was copied from an ancient record in 1350, but only the part related to the history from 1047 to 1223 were copied at this time, and the history from 1296 to 1350 was newly written.The document is an Important Cultural Property. The area in which the temple is located is part the former village of Tono, and is dotted with stone Buddha statues and stone pagodas dating back to the Kamakura period. Although it belongs to Kyoto Prefecture, geographically it is close to Heijō-kyō and Tōdai-ji in Nara.

Per the Jōruriji Rukinokoto, the Main Hall was built in 1047 by the priest Gimyō Shōnin, who was originally from Taima-dera. Sixty years later, in 1107, there is a record that the main image, a Yakushi Nyorai, was moved to the "Western Hall". There is no specific explanation of what this "Western Hall" is, but this record indicates that the original principal image of the temple was Yakushi Nyōrai, which is in agreement with the temple name, which comes from the "Pure Land of Yakushi Nyōrai". The seated Yakushi Nyōrai statue in the current three-story pagoda may have been the original main image. The current main hall was completed in 1157. The temple prospered in the Heian period, gaining numerous buildings and its pond was constructed in 1159 by the son of the Sesshō Fujiwara no Tadamichi. During the Nanboku-chō period, around 1349, it was the base of the Southern Court and was supported by Emperor Go-Daigo and his son, Emperor Go-Murakami. Into the Edo period, the temple was a branch of Kōfuku-ji, but converted to the Shingon Ritsu sect in the Meiji period.

== Main Hall ==
The Main Hall (National Treasure) was constructed in 1107 and moved to its present location in 1157. It is an 11x4 bay hip-gabled structure with a tile roof. The bays at the front of the hall have lattice windows on the upper half of the two bays at the left and right, and earthen walls on the lower half, with wooden doors for the remaining 9 bays. Apart from using boat-shaped brackets on the corner pillars, the building is simple, with no brackets on the outer pillars. The plan is "nine bays, four sides", meaning that the main building is nine bays across and two bays deep, with a one-bay wide eaves surrounding it. The interior of the hall is wooden-floored, and a long, horizontal platform is set up near the back of the main building, on which nine seated statues of Amida Nyōrai are placed in a row. The ceilings of both the main building and the eaves are not paneled, but are "decorative attic" that exposes structural materials such as rafters. Of the nine Amida Buddha the central statue is taller than the other eight statues, and the space between the pillars in the center of the hall where the central statue is enshrined is nearly twice as wide as the other spaces. The pillars in this center are thicker and longer than those on either side, and the decorative attic is therefore higher. For this reason, there was a theory that only the center part of the hall was originally built as a small hall, and the left and right parts were added later, but when repairs were made in 1967, there was no evidence of such construction in two periods. The roof is covered with tiles, but records of replacement with cypress bark in 1207 and 1328 indicate that it was originally bark-covered. It was covered with roof tiles in 1666, and the veranda at the front of the hall was added in the late Edo period.

During the 11th and 12th centuries, mainly during the period of Emperor Shirakawa and Emperor Toba, many nine-statue Amida halls were built. These were based on the idea of "nine stages of rebirth" as described in the "Amitāyus Contemplation Sūtra". The first example was the Muryōju-in Amida-do built by Fujiwara no Michinaga in 1020. There are over 30 examples recorded, but only Jōruri-ji remains today.

The nine wooden seated Amida Buddha statues (National Treasure) are made of hinoki cypress wood with a lacquered finish, and the height of the central statue is larger than the others, at 224.0 cm, while the eight side statues are 139.0 to 145.0 cm. The mudra of the central statue and the eight side statues are also different, with the former in the "Raigō-in mudra" with the right hand raised and the left hand lowered, and the latter in the "Amida's Join mudra" with both hands clasped in front of the stomach. Although there are nine mudra of Amida Buddha corresponding to each of the nine stages of rebirth, but in the case of the Jōruri-ji statues, the mudra of the eight side statues are all the same. There are no historical documents that directly prove the dates of the construction of the nine statues, and some researchers believe that they were made at the same time, while others believe that only the central statue is older and the eight side statues are later. In other words, some say that all nine statues were made at the time of the temple's founding in 1047, some say that all nine statues were made when the new main hall was built in 1107. The general consensus regarding the central statue is that it shares a similar style to the Amida Nyōrai statue in the Phoenix Hall of Byōdō-in (made in 1053), a work by Jōchō, but there is no consensus on which was carved earlier. The eight side statues are not identical, and exhibit different styles. The folds of the hem of the garments show that some have a U-shaped hem hanging down between the legs, while others are fan-shaped. The southernmost statue (leftmost when facing the statue) of the eight statues is thought to have been made closer to the Kamakura period due to differences in style. The lotus pedestals of the statues are mostly original. The halo of a thousand Buddhas carried by the central statue is a later addition, but the four flying celestial beings attached to the top of the halo are recognized to be from the Heian period.

Wooden Four Heavenly Kings (National Treasure) have heights of 167.0 to 169.7 cm (65.7 to 66.8 in), and are made in the yosegi-zukuri construction, covered in lacquer, gold leaf, coloring, and kirikane gold foil. The statues were carved in the late Heian period. The original coloring and kirikane patterns remain well preserved.

The Kichijōten standing statue with its enclosure is an Important Cultural Property. The statue has a height of 90.0 cm and is made of cypress wood, painted and kirikane. It was enshrined in the Main Hall in 1212 during the Kamakura period in a shrine to the left of the central statue of the Nine Amida Buddhas, and is a hibutsu statue that is only opened for certain periods each year. It is made with a front-to-back split joint and a split neck. "Front-to-back split joint" refers to splitting a single piece of wood into front and back parts with a chisel, hollowing out the inside, and then joining them together, while "split neck" refers to similarly inserting a chisel into the neck to split the head and body, hollowing out the inside, and then joining them together. The statue stands upright on a lotus throne, with its right arm lowered in a prayer mudra (palm open and facing forward), and its left arm bent at the elbow and palm raised to the shoulder, holding a jewel. The body is painted white, and the robes are painted in vivid colors, including silk.

Also within the Main Hall is a Kamakura period statue of Fudō Myōō with two attendants (ICP). The central statue is 99.5 cm (39.2 in) tall and is made of inlaid cypress wood with crystal eyes, coloring, and kirikane. There is also a Heian period standing wooden statue of Jizo Bosatsu. This 157.6-cm is made from a single piece of cypress wood, with carved eyes. It is placed to the right of the nine central Amida statues. A Kamakura period statue of Bato Kanon from Jōruri-ji formerly located in this hall is now on display at the Kyoto National Museum.

== Pagoda ==
The Three-story Pagoda (National Treasure) was moved from Ichijō Ōmiya in Kyoto in 1178, but it is unclear which temple it was originally from. A distinctive feature of the structure is that there are no pillars inside the first floor, and the central pillar is erected from the ceiling of the first floor. After being moved to Jōruri-ji, a Buddhist altar was placed inside the first floor and a statue of Yakushi Nyōrai (Important Cultural Property) was placed on top of it. The walls inside the first floor are decorated with murals of the Sixteen Arhats and other figures. These murals are also an Important Cultural Property.

== The Gardens ==
Jōruri-ji's layout forms a representation of the Pure Land. The large pond at the center of the grounds has is a small island in the middle with a shrine dedicated to Benzaiten. On the east bank of the pond is the three-story pagoda housing Yakushi Nyorai, and on the west bank is the main hall (Nine Amida Hall) housing nine images of Amida Nyorai. Yakushi Nyorai lives in the Eastern Pure Land and is a Buddha who removes the suffering of this world, while Amida Nyorai is in the Western Pure Land. This is the significance of placing Yakushi Nyorai in the east and Amida Nyorai in the west, and the east bank with the three-story pagoda can be seen as "this shore" (this world) and the west bank across the pond as "the other shore" where Amida Nyorai resides. When looking at the main hall from the other side of the pond, the face of Amida Nyorai in the center is hidden by the eaves of the main hall, but it can be seen when you look at its reflection in the pond. It was designed intentionally to allow visitors to see a glimpse of the Pure Land by looking at its reflection in the pond. The garden has been designated a Special Place of Scenic Beauty and a National Historic Site in 1985.

On either side of the pond are hexagonal stone lanterns dating to 1366, which are classified as Important Cultural Properties.

Beginning in 1976 the garden was restored to its original form by the landscape architect Mori Osamu.

The temple is approximately 20 minutes by car from Kamo Station on the JR West Yamatoji Line

== See also ==
- List of National Treasures of Japan (temples)
- List of National Treasures of Japan (sculptures)
- List of Special Places of Scenic Beauty, Special Historic Sites and Special Natural Monuments
- List of Cultural Properties of Japan – sculptures (Kyōto)
- List of Historic Sites of Japan (Kyōto)

== Sources and citations ==
Media related to Joururiji at Wikimedia Commons

== Bibliography ==
- David and Michiko Young, The Art of the Japanese Garden, Tuttle Publishing, Singapore, 2005. (ISBN 978-08048-3598-5)
