= Enjō-ji =

Enjō-ji (円成寺)
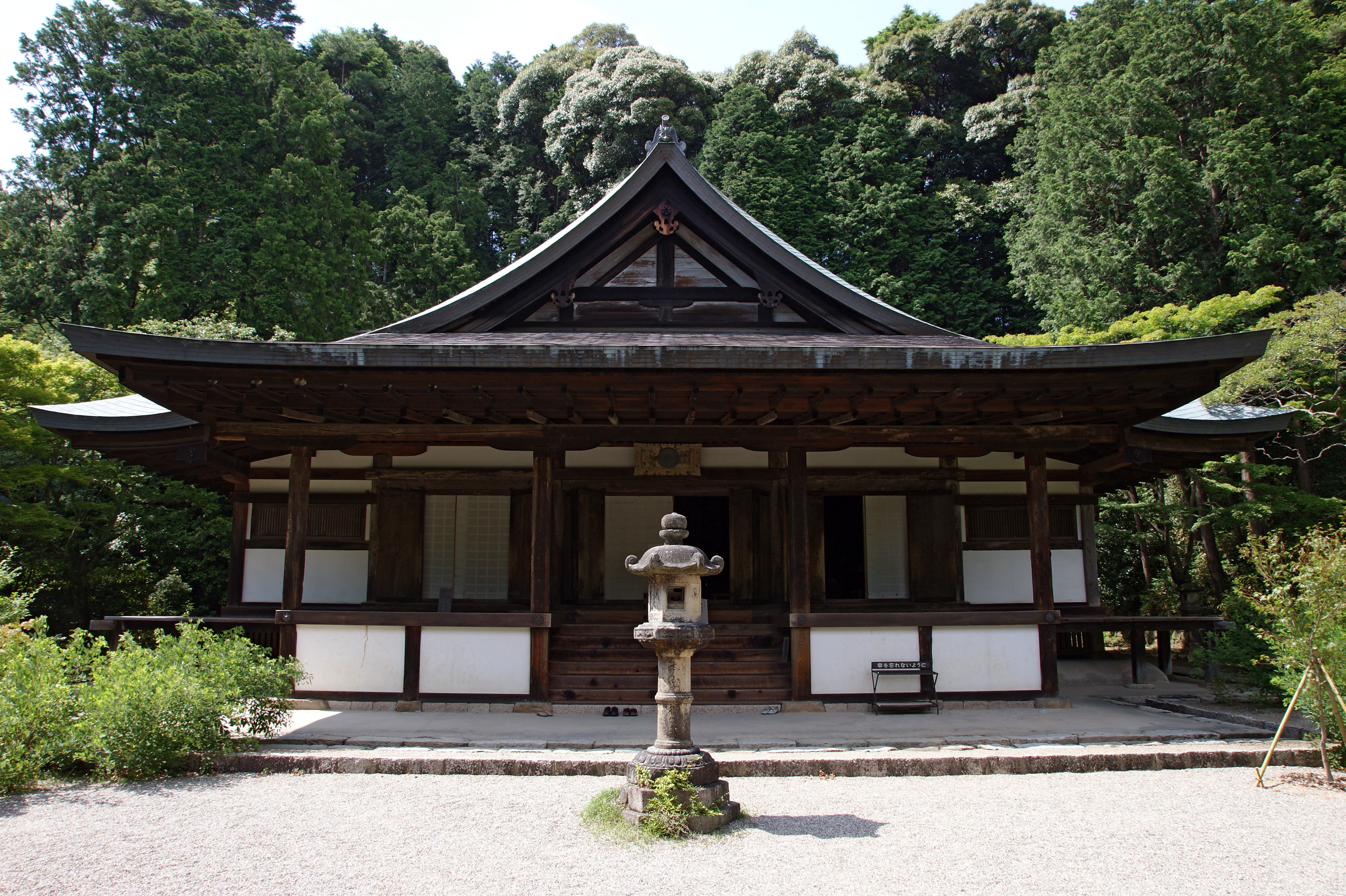
- Enjō-ji Hondō of 1472, an Important Cultural Property

- Location within Japan

Religion
- Affiliation: Omuro Shingon
- Deity: Amida Nyorai (Amitābha)

Location
- Location: 1273 Ninnikusen-chō, Nara, Nara Prefecture
- Country: Japan
- Coordinates: 34°41′45″N 135°54′55″E

Architecture
- Founder: Xulong, Emperor Shōmu & Empress Kōken
- Established: 756

Website
- http://www.enjyouji.jp/

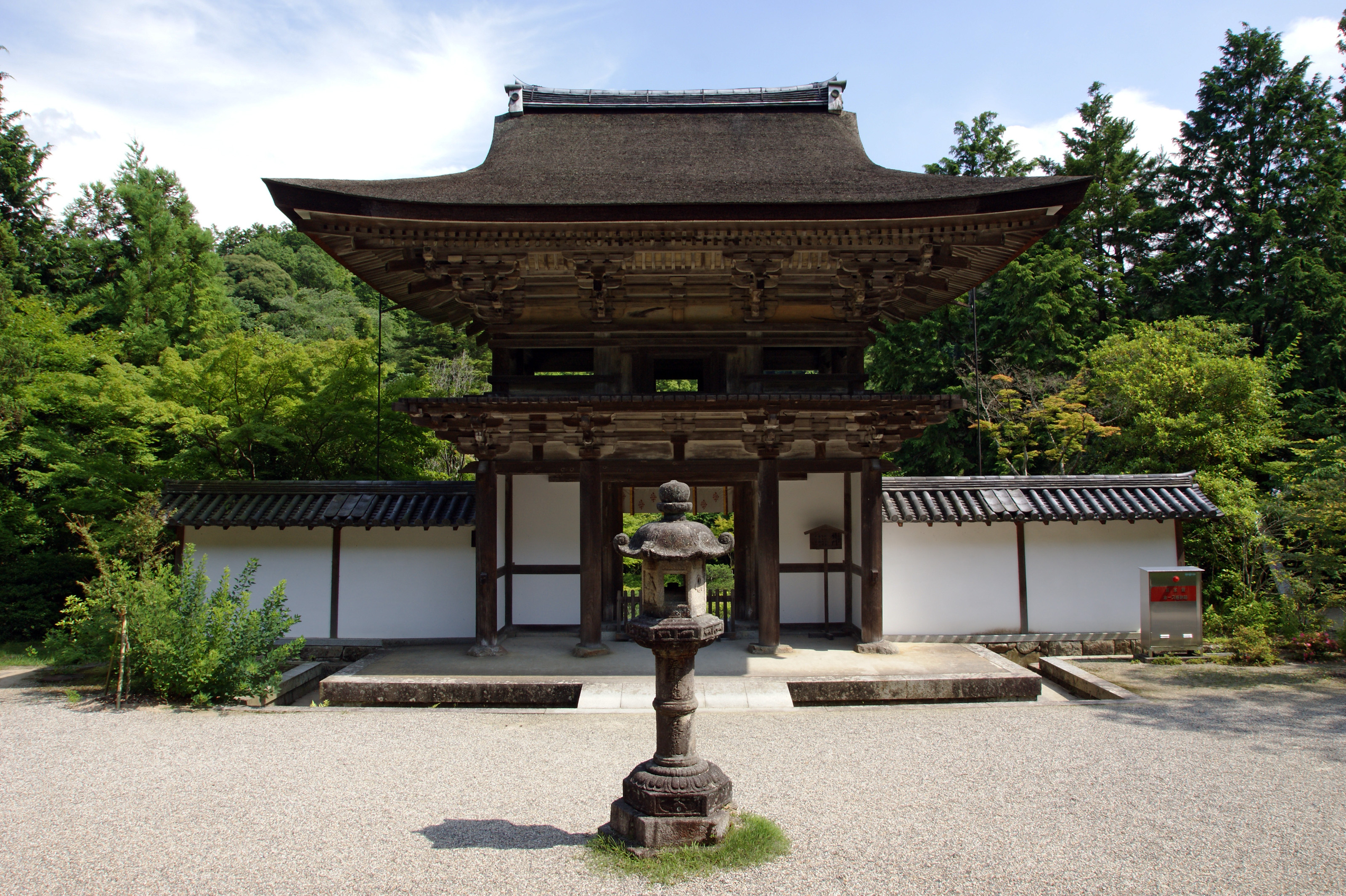
Two-storey gate of 1468, an Important Cultural Property

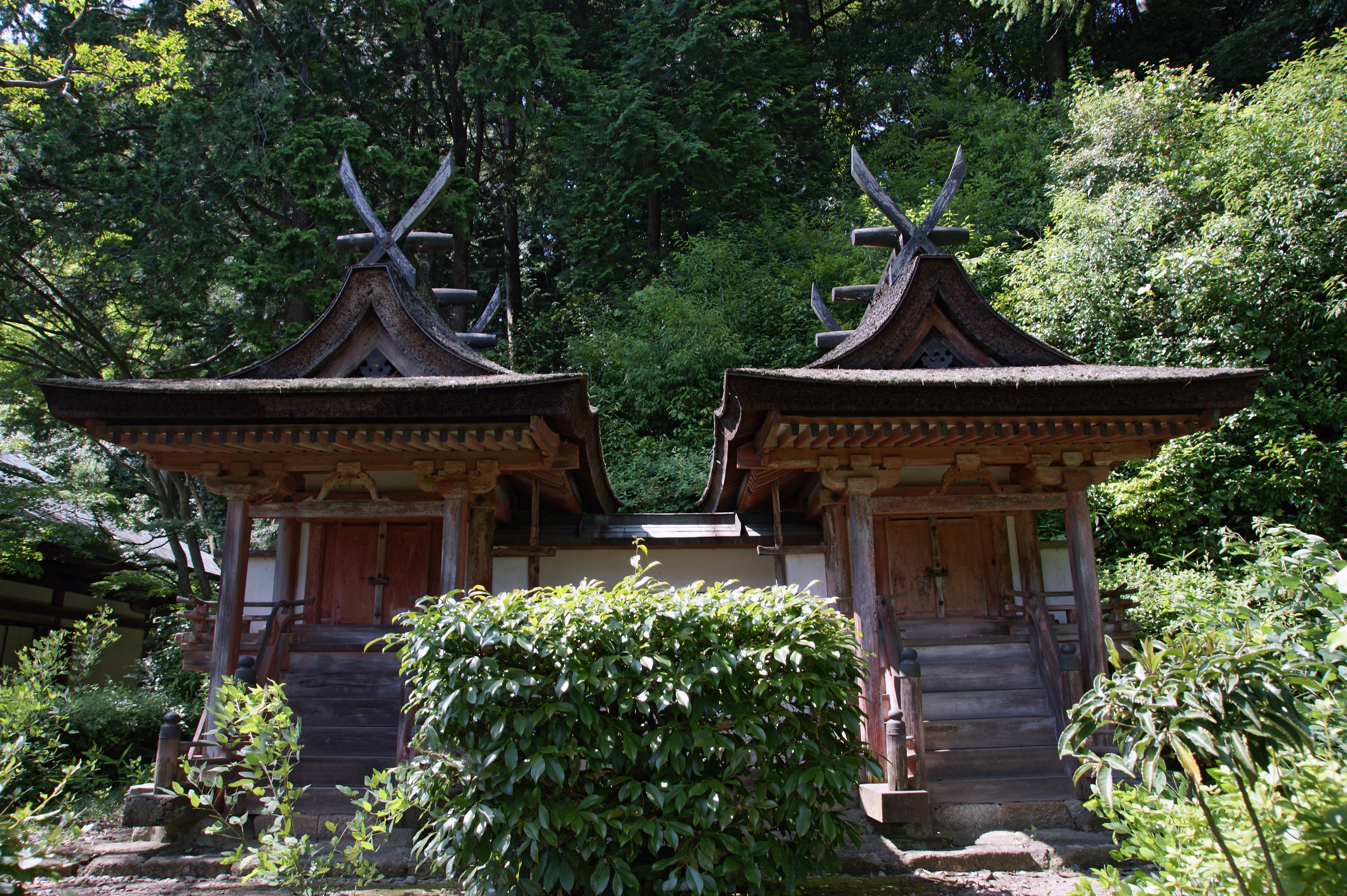
Kasugadō and Hakusandō shrines (1277/8), both National Treasures

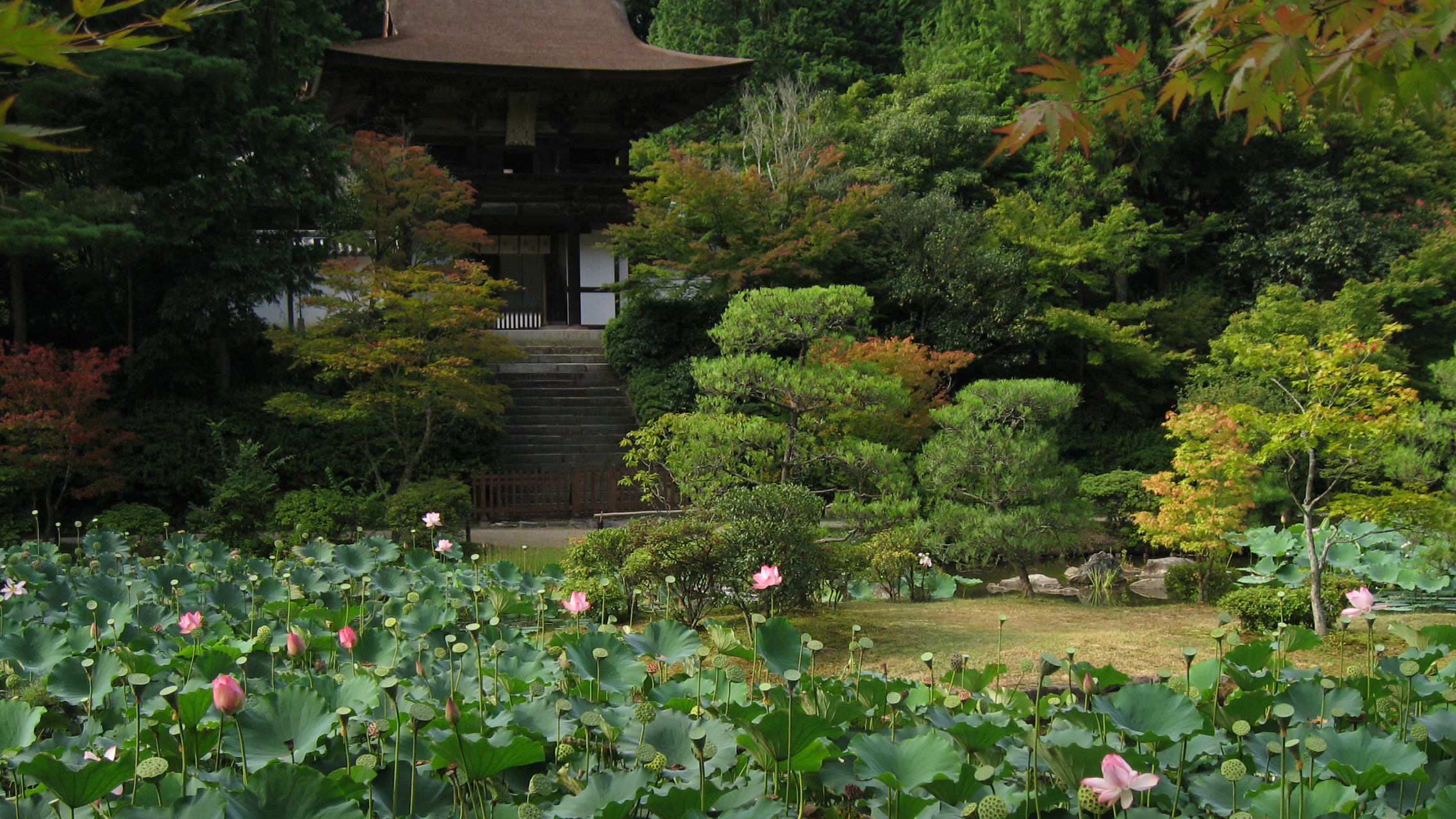
Paradise gardens of the late-Heian period, a Place of Scenic Beauty

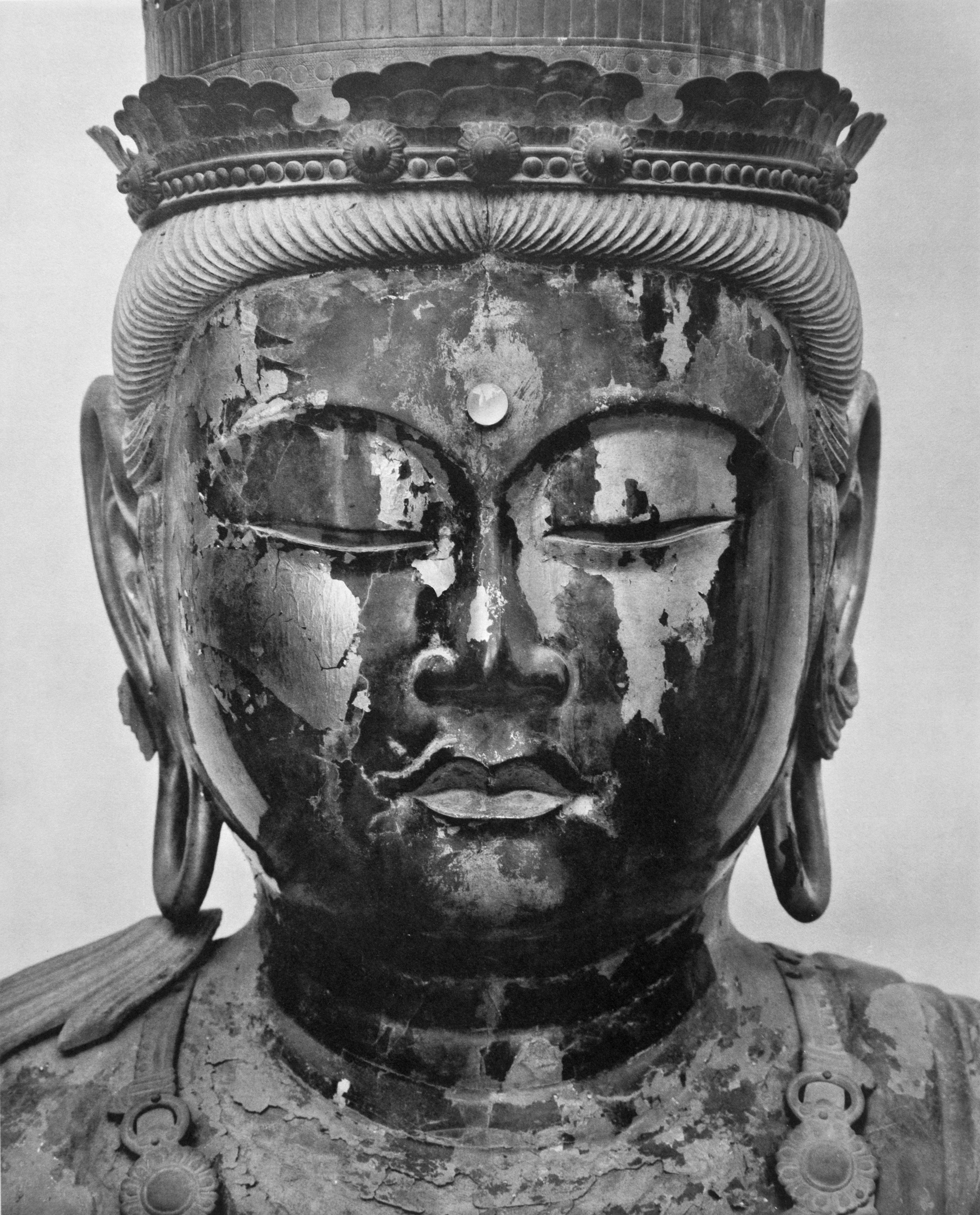
Dainichi Nyorai by Unkei (1176), a National Treasure

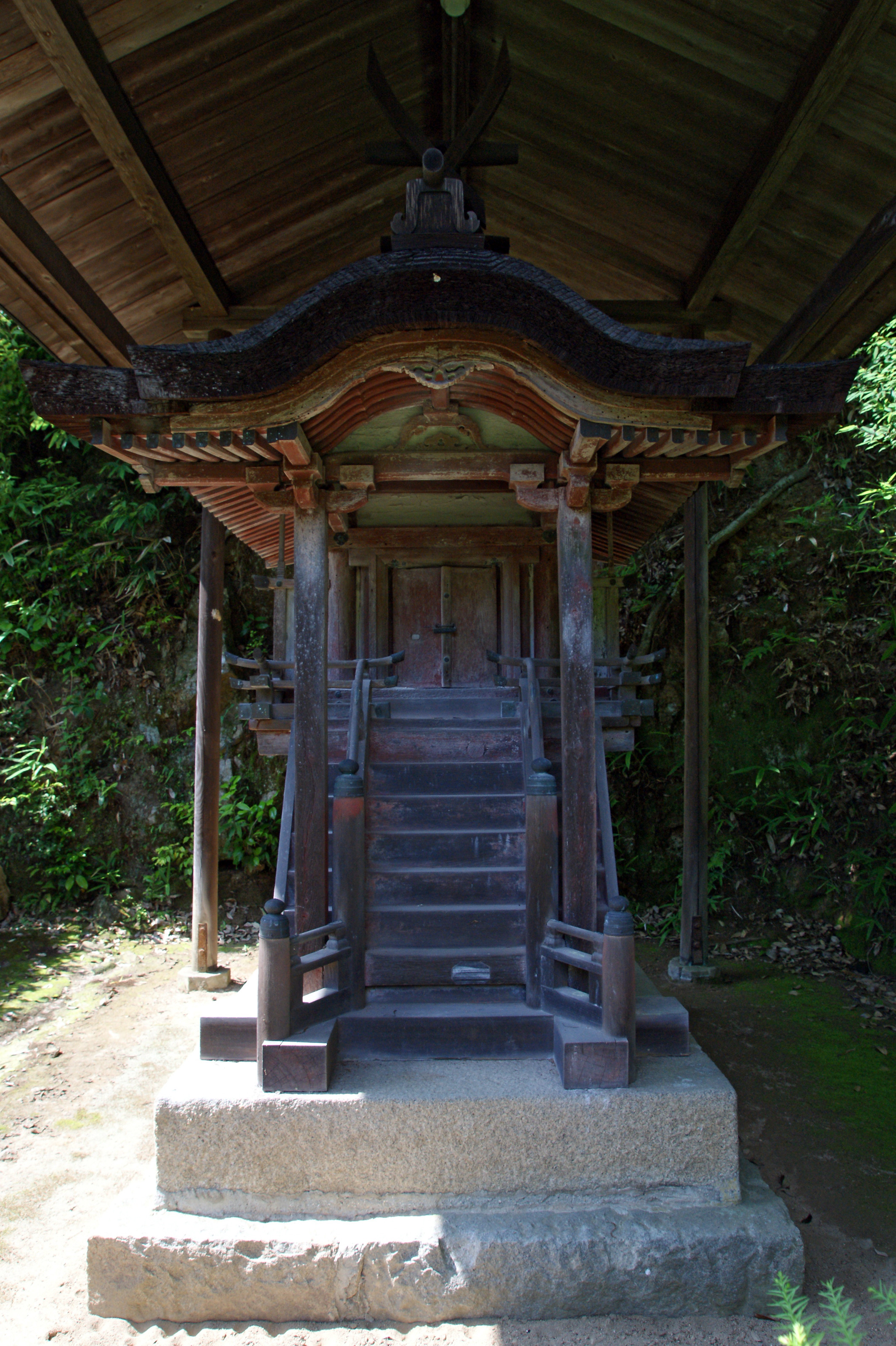
Honden of Ugajin, Kamakura period, an Important Cultural Property

Enjō-ji (円成寺) is a Shingon temple in the northeast of Nara, Japan. A number of its buildings and images have been designated National Treasures and Important Cultural Properties, and its late-Heian period gardens are a Place of Scenic Beauty.

== History ==
Enjō-ji is said to have been founded in 756 by a Chinese priest who accompanied Ganjin to Japan. The temple was enlarged in the late-Heian and Muromachi periods. Much damage occurred during the Ōnin War, and further losses occurred during the Meiji period and after.

== Buildings ==
The two-storey gate of 1468 and Hondō of 1472 are both Important Cultural Properties. The tahōtō is lost and has been replaced with a modern replica.

Also on the grounds are a number of Shinto shrines. The single bay Kasugadō and Hakusandō of 1227/8 are the oldest extant examples of kasuga-zukuri and are thought to have been moved from Kasuga-taisha when it was rebuilt. In 1953, both buildings were designated National Treasures. The Honden of the shrine to Ugajin dating to the end of the Kamakura period is an Important Cultural Property.

== Treasures ==
In the tahōtō is a seated wooden statue of Dainichi Nyorai (木造大日如来坐像) of 1176 by Unkei. Of Japanese cypress using the yoseki-zukuri technique, it is gilded over lacquer and has crystal eyes. In 1920, it was designated a National Treasure. In the Hondō is a seated wooden statue of Amida Nyorai (木造阿弥陀如来坐像) of the Heian period, surrounded by wooden statues of the Shitennō (木造四天王立像) of the Kamakura period, all Important Cultural Properties. Other images include a Jūichimen Kannon of 1026, a child prince of 1309 that has been designated a Prefectural Cultural Property, a Fudō Myōō of the Nanboku-chō period, and a gilded Yakushi Nyorai. The gorintō of 1321 has also been designated an Important Cultural Property.

== Gardens ==
The temple gardens are a rare example of late-Heian Pure Land paradise gardens and in 1973 were designated a Place of Scenic Beauty.

== See also ==
- List of National Treasures of Japan (shrines)
- List of National Treasures of Japan (sculptures)
- Thirteen Buddhist Sites of Yamato
- Japanese gardens
- Place of Scenic Beauty
- Honji suijaku
