= Rokuharamitsu-ji =

Buddhist temple in Higashiyama-ku, Kyoto, Japan

- 六波羅蜜寺
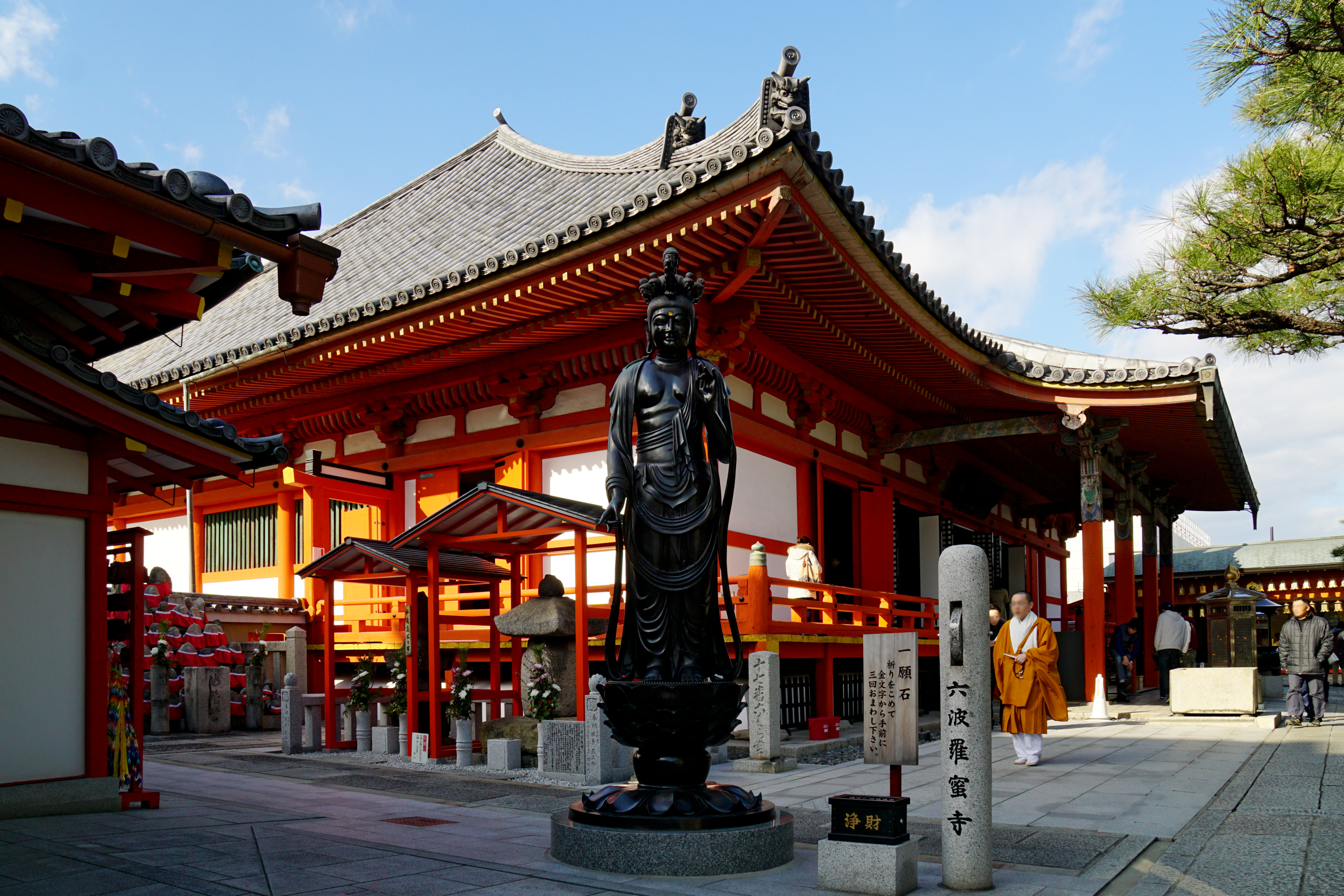
- Hondō (ICP)

- Location within Kyoto Prefecture Location within Japan

Religion
- Affiliation: Buddhist
- Deity: Jūichimen Kannon
- Rite: Shingon-shū Chisan-ha
- Status: functional

Location
- Location: 81-1, Rokkocho, 2-chome, Higashiyama-ku, Matsubara-dori Yamato-oji Higashiiru, Kyoto-shi, Kyoto-fu 605-0813
- Interactive map of Rokuharamitsu-ji
- Coordinates: 34°59′49.57″N 135°46′23.91″E

Architecture
- Founder: Kūya
- Completed: 951
- National Treasure National Important Cultural Property

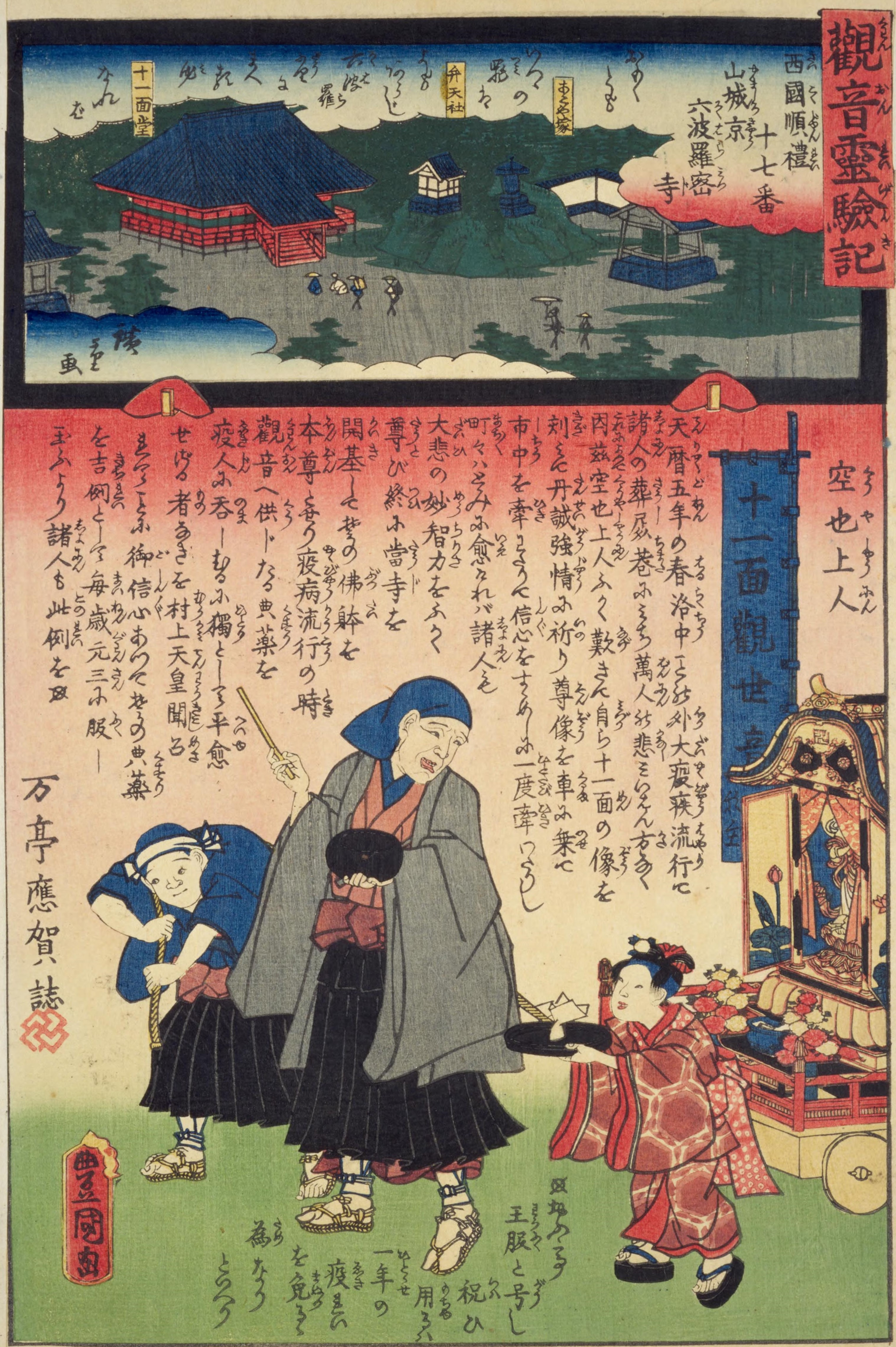
from the picture album "Kannon Reigen ki"

Rokuharamitsu-ji (六波羅蜜寺) is a Buddhist temple located in the Rokkaku-dori Matsubara-dori Yamato-oji Higashiiru neighborhood of Higashiyama-ku, Kyoto, Japan. It belongs to the Shingon-shū Chisan-ha sect of Japanese Buddhism and its honzon is a hibutsu statue of Jūichimen Kannon that is designated a National Treasure. The temple's full name is Fudaraku-san Fumon-in Rokuharamitsu-ji (補陀洛山 普門院 六波羅蜜寺).The temple is the 17th stop on the Saigoku Kannon Pilgrimage route.

== Overview ==
The founding of this temple is uncertain. According to the Heian period history book Fusō Ryakuki, the temple originated from a training hall dedicated to Jūichimen Kannon, which was built in 951 Kūya, known for his dancing nembutsu. It was originally called Saikō-ji (西光寺). During the plague epidemic in Kyoto at the time, Kūya is said to have saved many people by pulling this Kannon statue around the city in a cart, chanting nembutsu, and serving tea to the sick. Another theory is that Kūya held a large-scale memorial service for the Large Prajñāpāramitā Sūtras on the banks of the Kamo River in August 963, and that this was the founding of Saikō-ji. At the time, the Kamo River was a place for the disposal of corpses and funerals.

After Kūya's death, in 977, Chushin, a monk from Enryaku-ji on Mount Hiei, renamed the temple Rokuharamitsu-ji and re-established it under the Tendai sect. The new name may have come from the Buddhist doctrine of the six "Rokuharamitsu," loosely translated as "perfection"; however, another theory is that it originated from the fact that the area was called "Rokuhara" (six fields). The temple came to be associated ties with the Heike clan in the late Heian period when Taira no Masamori built the nearby Amida-dō (now Jōkō-in). Taira no Tadamori stationed his troops in a sub-temple of the temple, and eventually built a mansion called "Rokuharaden" next to the temple grounds. Taira no Kiyomori incorporated the temple into the Heike clan's compound, and over 5,200 Heike residences were constructed within and around the temple. In 1183, when the Heike clan fled the capital in the Genpei War, the temple caught fire. The fire also burned the temple's other buildings, but only the main hall survived. After this, the Kamakura shogunate established the Rokuhara Tandai on the ruins of the Heike mansion and residences.

Rokuharamitsu-ji was rebuilt by Minamoto no Yoritomo and Ashikaga Yoshiakira. The main hall was rebuilt again in 1363 during the Nanboku-chō period. However, the temple grounds suffered repeated fires. During the Bunroku era (1593-1596), when Toyotomi Hideyoshi erected the Kyoto Daibutsu, Rokuharamitsu-ji was repaired and the temple was granted 70 koku of land for its upkeep. At this time, it became a branch temple of the Shingon sect's Chishaku-in. A large temple complex existed until the end of the Edo period. Following the anti-Buddhist movement during the Meiji Restoration, the temple grounds were significantly reduced in size, and the main hall is now surrounded by private houses, making the grounds smaller.

In 1969, the main hall was dismantled and repaired, during which approximately 8,000 mud pagodas, mentioned in works such as "Konjaku Monogatarishu" and "Sankaiki," were excavated from the base.

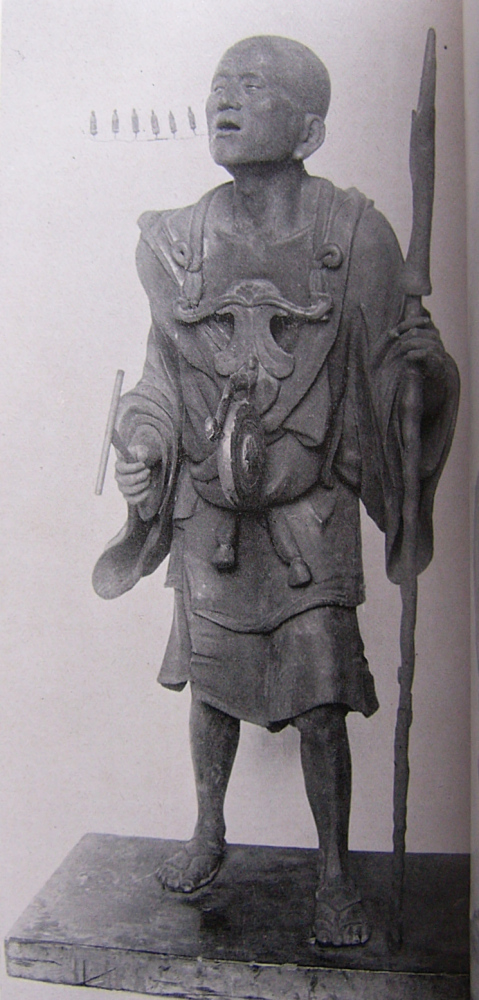
Statue of Kūya (ICP)

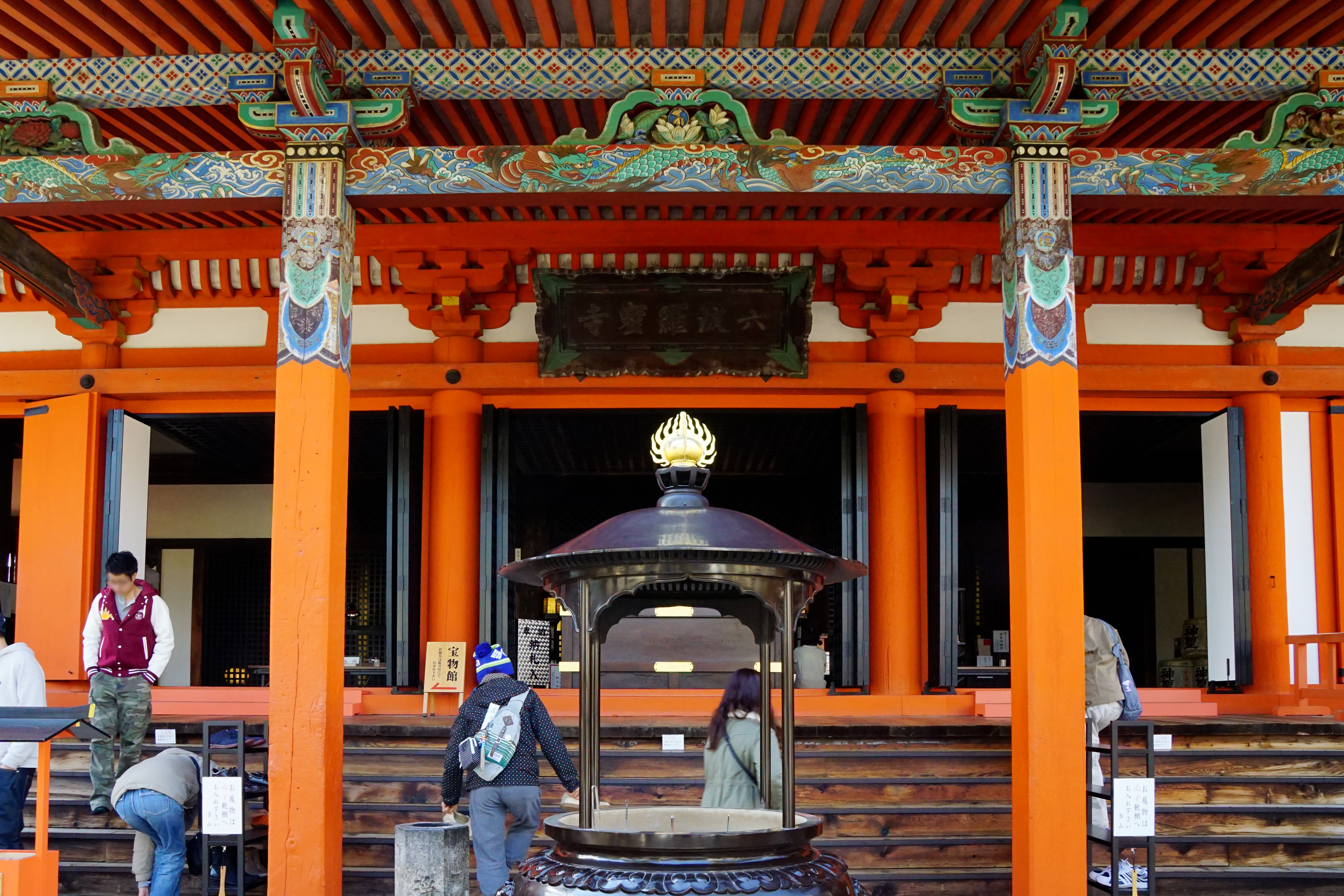
Hondō

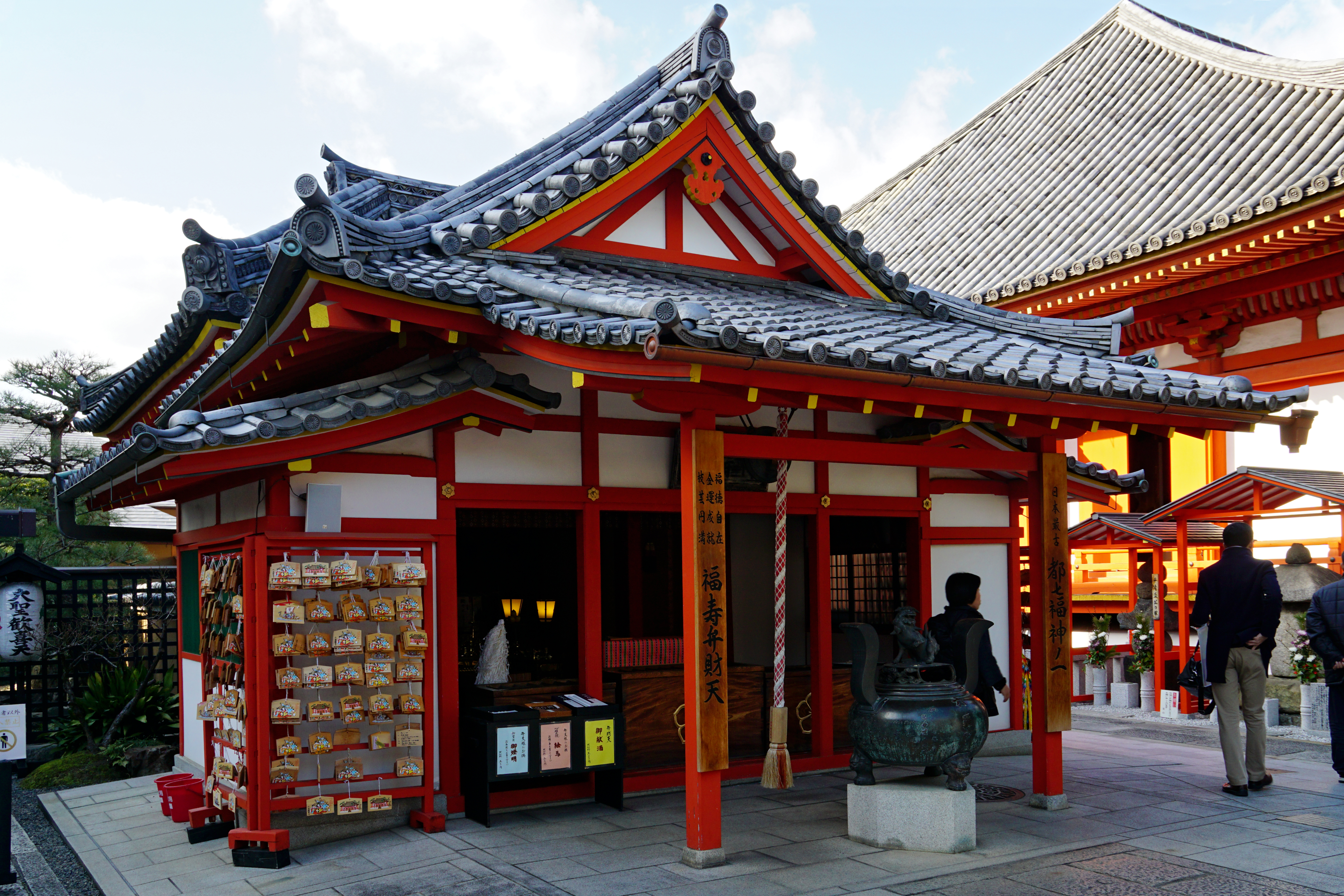
Benten-dō

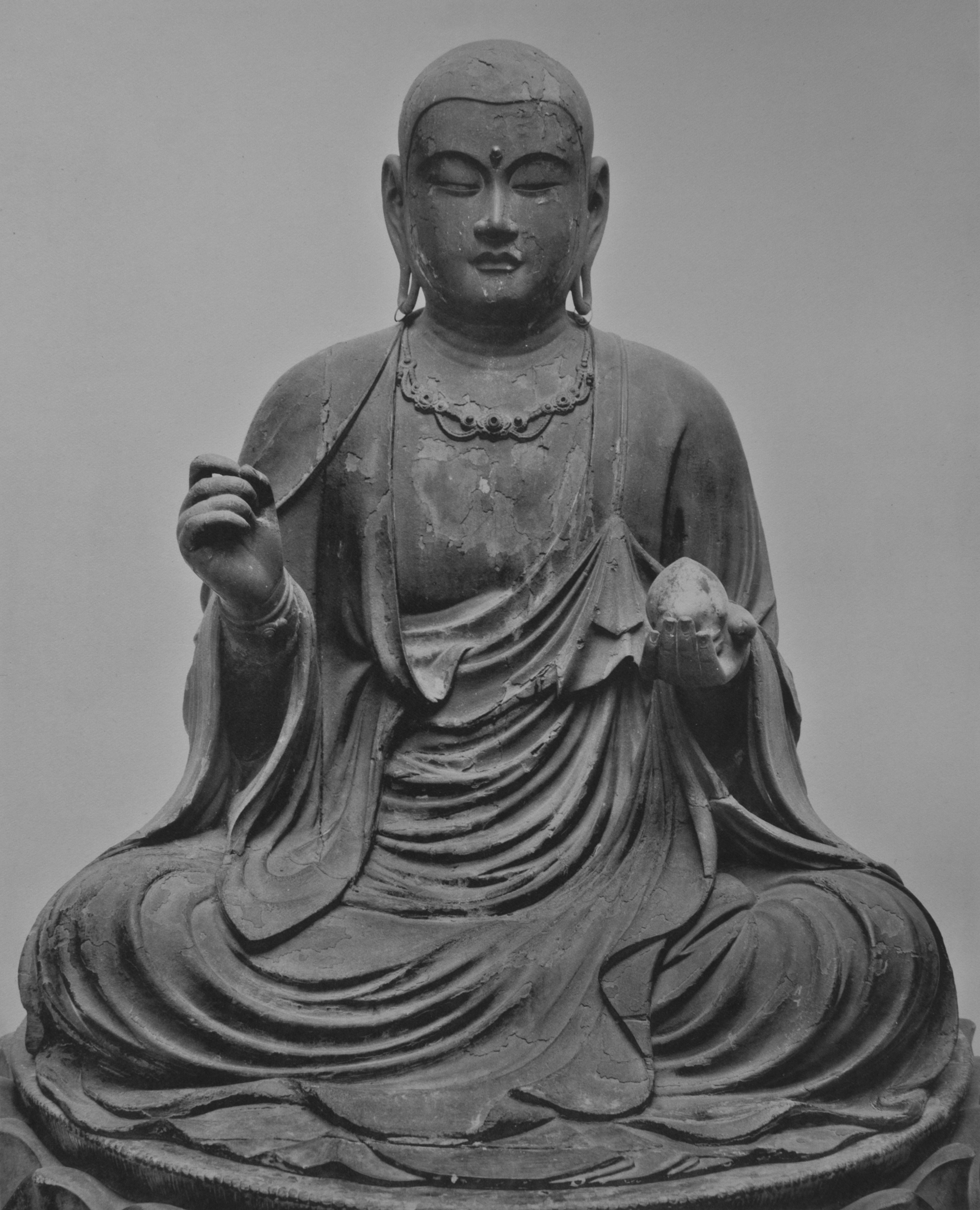
Jizō Bosatsu (attribued to Unkei)

The temple is approximately a seven-minute walk from Kiyomizu-Gojō Station on the Keihan Main Line or a 15-minute walk from Kyoto Kawaramachi Station on the Hankyu Kyoto Main Line.

== Cultural Properties ==
=== National Treasures ===
- Wooden statue of standing Jūichimen Kannon (木造十一面観音立像), early Heian period

=== National Important Cultural Properties ===
- Hondō (本堂), Muromachi period (1363) The Tendai-style building has a wooden-floored outer sanctuary and a lower, earthen floor with a quarter-floored floor, separated by sliding doors. The current veranda was added to the main hall by Toyotomi Hideyoshi during the Bunroku era (1593-1596). It was dismantled and repaired in 1969.
- Wooden portrait statue of standing Kūya Shōnin (木造空也上人立像), Kamakura period; This statue was carved by Unkei's fourth son, Yasukatsu. While portraits of monks are often depicted seated, this one depicts Kūya walking in straw sandals walking through the streets of Kyoto, where an epidemic was raging, ringing a gong and chanting Buddhist prayers to ward off the plague. Kūya wears a gong around his neck, holds a wooden mallet in his right hand, and a staff with deer antlers in his left. Six small statues of Amida Buddha emerge from Kuya's mouth. The six Amida Buddhas symbolize the six characters of "Namu Amida Butsu," visually representing the chanting of the prayer. The six statues are connected by wire.
- Wooden statue of seated Taira no Kiyomori as a priest (木造僧形坐像(伝・平清盛像)), Kamakura period;
- Wooden statue of seated Jizō Bosatsu (木造地蔵菩薩坐像), Kamakura period; Although there is no inscription, the statue is believed to have been made by Unkei based on temple tradition and the style of the work.
- Wooden portrait statues of seated Unkei and Tankei (木造〈伝運慶／伝湛慶〉坐像), Kamakura period (2 statues);
- Wooden statues of standing Four Heavenly Kings (木造四天王立像), Heian period (4 statues);
- Wooden statue of seated Yakushi Nyorai (木造薬師如来坐像), Heian period;
- Wooden statue of standing Jizō Bosatsu (木造地蔵菩薩立像), Heian period;
- Wooden statue of seated Kōbō Daishi (木造弘法大師坐像), Kamakura period;
- Wooden statue of seated Emma-Ō (木造閻魔王坐像), Kamakura period;
- Wooden statue of standing Kichijō-ten (木造吉祥天立像), Kamakura period;

=== National Important Tangible Folk Cultural Property ===
- Materials on the religious beliefs of the common people at Rokuharamitsu-ji (六波羅蜜寺の庶民信仰資料), Heian - Kamakura period; 2163 items (1,945 mud pagodas, 101 items related to the Mantoukai festival, 60 tea bowls, 57 other items)

=== Kyoto Prefecture Designated Tangible Cultural Properties ===
- Colored drawings of the Ten Kings on paper by Lu Shinzhong (紙本著色十王図 陸信忠筆), Yuan Dynasty;
- Solicitation letter for the reconstruction of Rokuharamitsu-ji (六波羅蜜寺再興勧進状), Nanboku-cho period;
- Records of contributions by daimyo from various provinces (諸国大名寄進録), Nanboku-cho period;

== See also ==
- List of National Treasures of Japan (sculptures)
