= Dainichi Nyorai (Enjō-ji) =

Japanese wooden sculpture

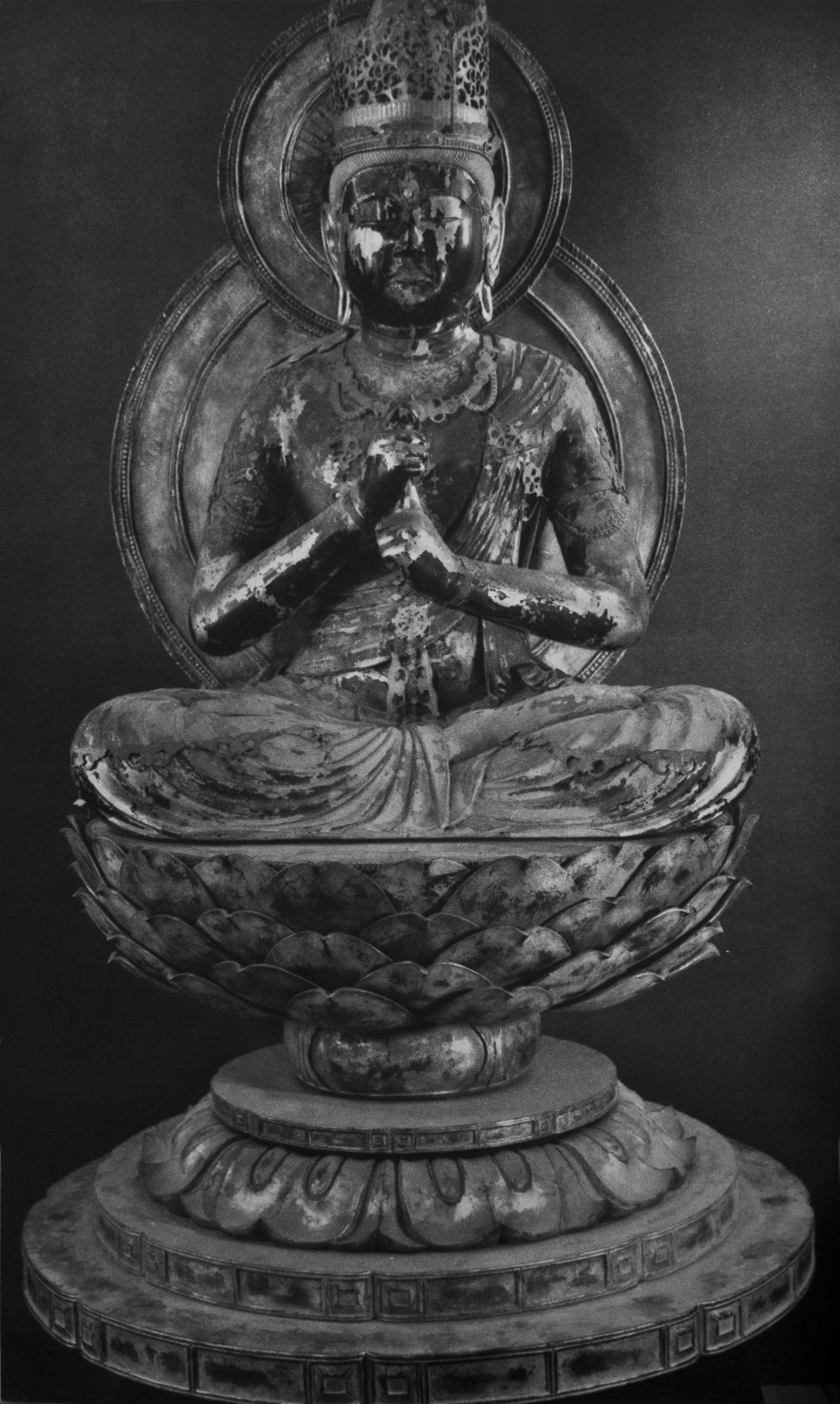
Dainichi Nyorai by Unkei, Enjō-ji, 1176, National Treasure

The seated wooden statue of Dainichi Nyorai (木造大日如来坐像, mokuzō Dainichi Nyorai zazō) at the Shingon temple of Enjō-ji in Nara is the earliest and best-substantiated work by Japanese master sculptor Unkei. An inscription on the pedestal records that he began work on the piece in 1175 and brought it to completion the following year. The sculpture has been designated a National Treasure. (Note: The statue was designated a National Treasure in 1920, under the 1897 Ancient Temples and Shrines Preservation Law; with the 1950 Law for the Protection of Cultural Properties, the statue was redesignated an Important Cultural Property; the statue was again designated a National Treasure in 1993.) Unkei's next documented works, from the early 1180s, were commissioned by military leaders prominent in the ensuing Kamakura shogunate, for temples in eastern Japan. These works are physically more massive and powerful, as are his giant Niō at Tōdai-ji. By contrast, in this early work Unkei employed a more "gentle" or "tranquil" style.

== Subject ==
Dainichi Nyorai (Sanskrit: Mahāvairocana) is the central deity of Esoteric Buddhism. As opposed to the "revealed teaching", understandable to the intellect of the common man, the "concealed teaching" (mikkyō) of Esoteric Buddhism offers Buddhahood and paradise on earth to the initiate, through ritual practice and the contemplation of sacred images. According to Kūkai, the founder of the Shingon school of Esoteric Buddhism in the early ninth century, "because the secret storehouse [Mikkyō teaching] is so profound and mysterious it is difficult to manifest with brush and ink [text]. Thus it is revealed to the unenlightened by adopting the form of images. The great variety of postures and mudrās are the effect of Buddha's great compassion. With a single glance [at the images] one becomes a Buddha."

Dainichi (lit. "Great Sun") is worshipped as the supreme, primordial sun Buddha and also appears as the central figure of the Five Wisdom Buddhas. Under the syncretic doctrine of honji suijaku, the Shinto sun goddess Amaterasu was considered a manifestation of Dainichi Nyorai. The term Nyorai (lit. "thus-come one") is an epithet for the enlightened Buddhas that occupy the highest rank in the Japanese Buddhist pantheon. In the Mandala of the Two Realms, the principle mandala for ritual activity and contemplation in Shingon Buddhism, Dainichi Nyorai appears in the centre of both the Diamond Realm and the Womb Realm. In the former, as defined by the Dainichi Sutra, Dainichi represents the "metaphysical presence that embodies reason"; in the latter, as defined by the Diamond Peak Sutra, Dainichi represents the "epistemological presence that embodies wisdom".

== Iconography ==
Unlike the other Buddhas, Dainichi Nyorai is typically depicted in the form of a bodhisattva, with the garments, adornments, and long hair of the nobility of ancient India. In this image Dainichi is bare-chested, with flowing draperies hanging from the left shoulder; the head is crowned, the arms, wrists, neck, chest, and legs bejewelled; the topknot is high, with long hair resting on the right shoulder. Dainichi Nyorai appears in two principal guises as denoted by the mudrā or ritual gesture formed by the hands, that of the Diamond Realm and that of the Womb Realm. Here the mudrā is that of the "knowledge fist" of the Diamond Realm, with the fingers of the right hand symbolizing the five elements penetrated by the Buddhist essence as represented by the index finger of the left hand. The gesture also symbolizes the mystic union of the material with the spiritual of yoga practice, which in Tibet and Nepal takes the form of the ecstatic Yab-Yum embrace, but in China and Japan is sublimated in this mudrā.

The double round halo, one for the head attached to that for the body, represents the light emitted by the Buddha, as emphasized by the rays surrounding the lotus cushion on which the head rests. In the Brahma Net Sutra, translated into Chinese in 406 and copied and expounded on imperial orders through all the provinces in mid-eighth century Japan, Dainichi Nyorai appears seated on a lotus pedestal, around which all gather to hear his teaching of the law. Here Dainichi sits atop a six-tier lotus pedestal with alternately arranged petals.

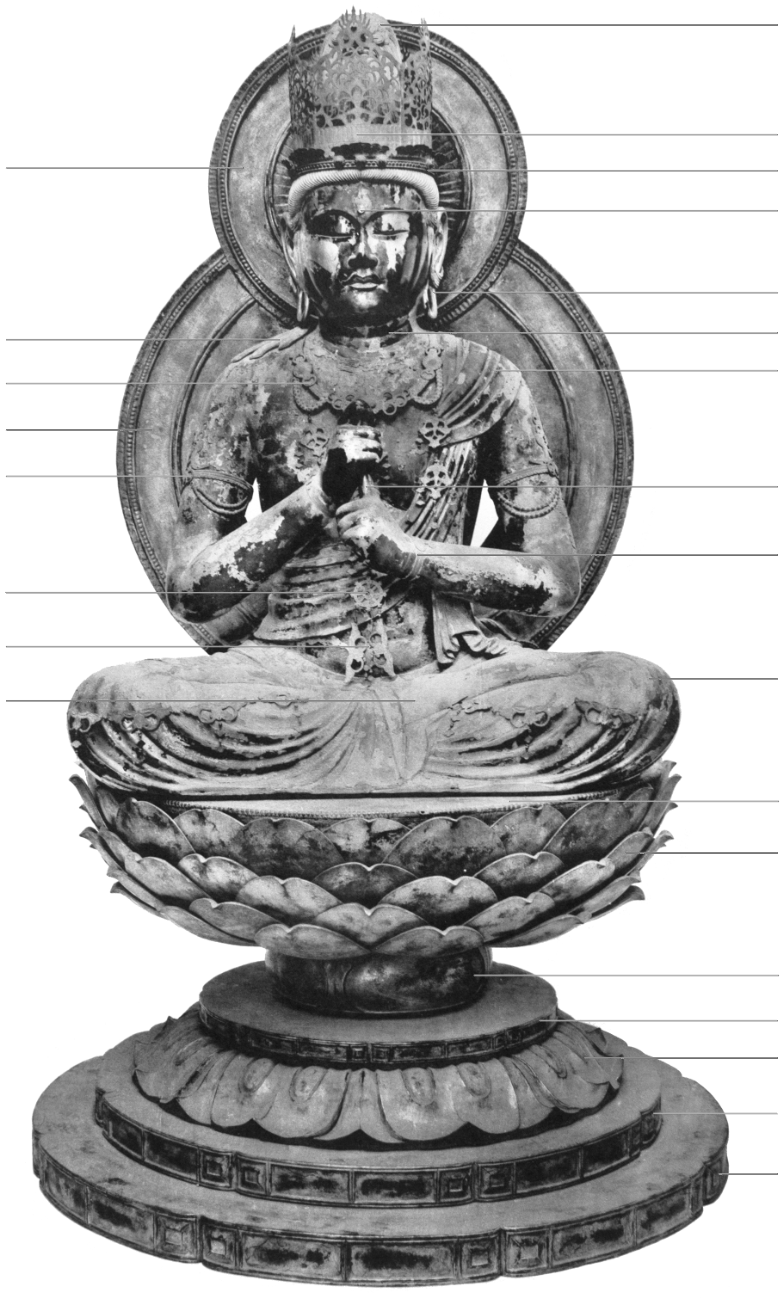

== Technology ==
Approximately ninety percent of Important Cultural Property and National Treasure sculptures are made of wood. All of Unkei's surviving works are in this medium. This piece employs the joined-block technique known as yosegi-zukuri, which has the twin advantages of obviating the need for large pieces of timber while facilitating the hollowing-out process which helps reduce shrinkage and cracking. Six main blocks of hinoki or Japanese cypress were used, two vertical blocks arranged side by side and end on for the torso and head; one horizontal piece for the legs; one for the top-knot; and two wedges for the thighs; the arms are assembled from a number of further pieces. After carving, hollowing, and assembly, the statue was lacquered and covered in gold leaf. The double halo and pedestal are of similar materials. The eyes are of rock crystal, inserted into the open sockets from inside and held in place by bamboo pins, with painted pupils. Eyes formed in this way seem to move in the guttering firelight of a temple and are one of the defining features of the sculpture of the Kamakura period that began a decade later. The lips are painted red and the hair blue. The jewels and crown are of gilt bronze.

== History ==
According to an inscription in black ink on the underside of the lotus heart of the pedestal, the statue was begun by Unkei, "true apprentice of great busshi Kōkei", on the twenty-fourth day of the eleventh month of 1175 and was completed on the nineteenth day of the tenth month of 1176; Unkei's fee was forty-three lengths of Hachijō-jima silk. (Note: The inscription reads: 運慶承 安元元年十一月廿四日始之 | 給料物上品八丈絹肆拾参疋也 | 已上御身料也 | 奉渡安元弐秊丙申十月十九日 | 大仏師康慶 | 実弟子運慶 "Unkei in compliance: begun on the 24th day of the eleventh month of Angen 1 [1175] | for payment of forty-three lengths of superior quality silk cloth from Hachijō-jima | that is all as regards payment | completed and handed over in heishin [1176 per sexagenary cycle] on the 19th day of the tenth month of Angen 2 [1176] | great busshi Kōkei's | true apprentice, Unkei") The Record of the shrines and temples of Yamato (和州社寺記, Washū shajiki) states that the statue was installed in the tahōtō. At an uncertain date two panels were opened in the back of the head of the statue, either for repairs to the eyes or to enable the insertion of holy objects, as found in numerous other instances. The statue survived the destruction of the tahōtō by fire during the Ōnin War; subsequently it was installed in the hondō. In 1921 repair work was carried out, at which time the inscription was discovered. The third tahōtō, erected to replace that moved to Kamakura in 1920, was constructed between 1986 and 1990. In 1991 the statue was exhibited at the Kyoto National Museum. Unkei's Dainichi Nyorai is now once again installed in the tahōtō, against a backdrop of painted Buddhas and vajra on the columns and wall behind the altar.

== See also ==
- List of National Treasures of Japan (sculptures)
- Kei school
