= Unkei =

Japanese sculptor

Unkei 運慶
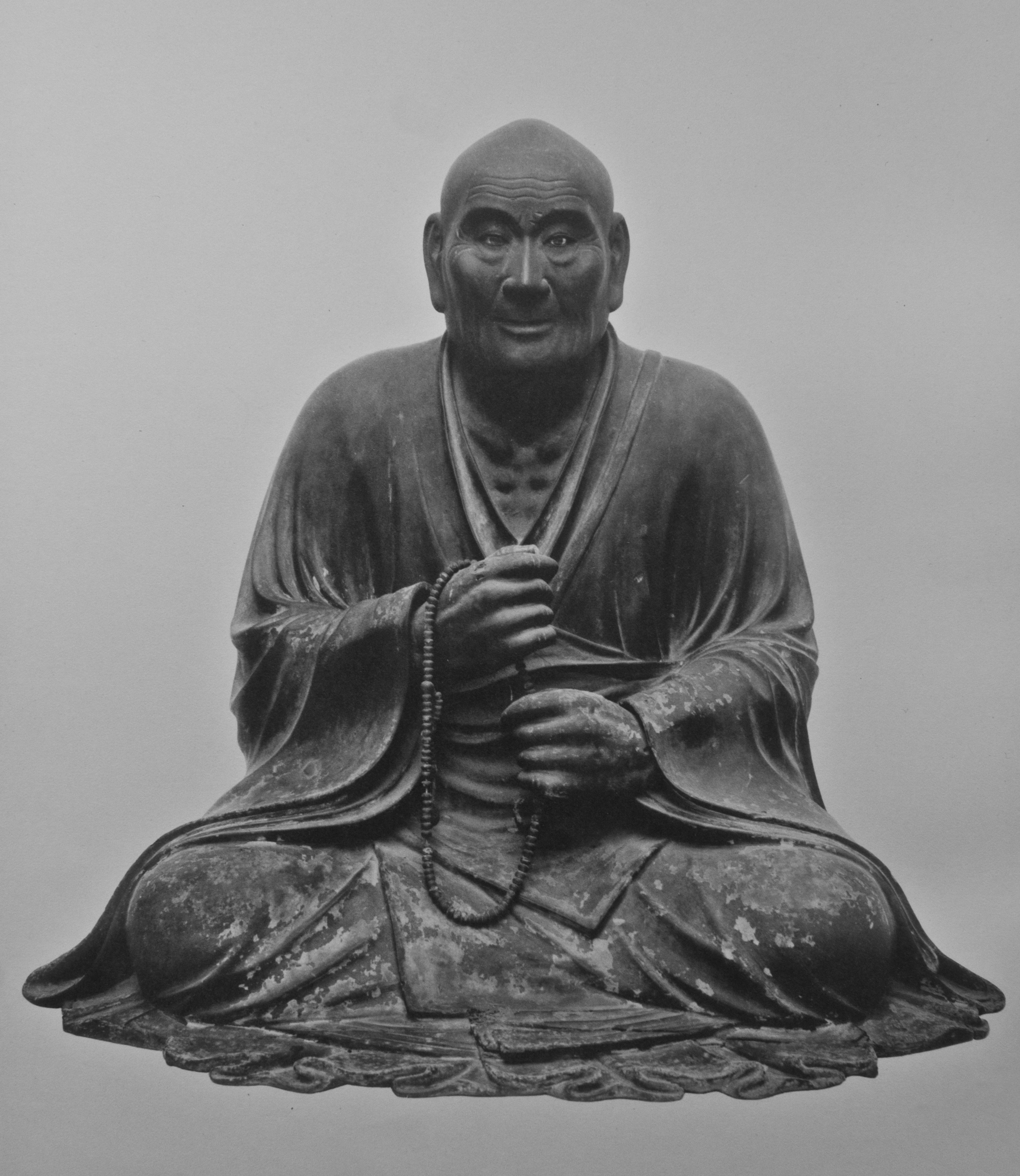
- Unkei in the guise of a monk.
- Born: c. 1150; Kansai region, Japan
- Died: 1223 (aged 72–73); Kansai region, Japan
- Known for: Sculpture
- Notable work: Dainichi Nyorai at Enjō-ji (National Treasure); Six Attendants of Fudō Myōō at Reihōkan (National Treasure); Kongōrikishi at Tōdai-ji (National Treasure); Muchaku and Seshin at Kōfuku-ji (National Treasure)
- Movement: Kei school

Unkei (運慶; Japanese pronunciation: [ɯꜜŋ.kei, -keː], c. 1150 – 1223) was a Japanese sculptor of the Kei school, which flourished in the Kamakura period. He specialized in statues of the Buddha and other important Buddhist figures. Unkei's early works are fairly traditional, similar in style to pieces by his father, Kōkei. However, the sculptures he produced for the Tōdai-ji in Nara show a flair for realism different from anything Japan had seen before. Today, Unkei is the best known of the Kei artists, and many art historians consider him its "most distinguished member".

== Career ==
Many extant works are said to be his, but the first that can be attributed to him with any certainty is a Dainichi Nyorai at Enjō-ji in Nara (1176).

Unkei was a devout Buddhist, and records from 1183 (Heian period end) show that he transcribed two copies of the Lotus Sutra with the aid of two calligrapher monks and a woman sponsor named Akomaro. In the works' colophon, Unkei gives the names of all involved in performing the ritual obeisance (raihai) during the project's duration; the list includes Unkei himself and several members of his school. Unkei further records that he tallied the lines copied at the end of each day and then had devotees bow three times and chant the "august title" (likely daimoku) and the nembutsu for each one. In all, Unkei records that "During the copying, the above persons bowed fifty thousand times and [chanted] the nenbutsu one hundred thousand times, and the august title of the Lotus Sutra, one hundred thousand times." In 1203, Unkei worked with Kaikei, two other master sculptors, and 16 assistants to create two guardian figures for the gates of the Nandaimon (Great South Gate) of Tōdai-ji in Nara. The statues, known as the Kongō Rikishi or Niō, are 26 feet tall. The team finished the figures in 72 days using the yosegi technique of sculpting various pieces of wood separately and then combining them for the finished product.

Sometime between 1208 and 1212, Unkei sculpted a figure of a Miroku Butsu (Sanskrit: Maitreya Buddha) at Kōfuku-ji, along with several accompanied figures. These included two bodhisattva, the Shitennō (Four Heavenly Kings), and a pair of Indian rakan (Sanskrit: arhats) named Muchaku and Seshin. Only the Miroku Butsu and rakan still stand today. After the completion of these works and others at the Kōfuku-ji, Unkei moved the Kei school's headquarters to Kyoto.

Unkei was chiefly acting in Kyoto and Nara. However, he traveled to Kamakura sometimes to do commissions for high-ranking samurai and administrators of the shogunate.

A late 12th century sculpture of Dainichi Nyorai, attributed to Unkei, sold at auction at Christie's on March 18, 2008 for US$14.37 million, making it the most expensive Japanese art ever sold.

== Style ==
Unkei's early works are similar in style to those of his father, Kōkei, and contemporary, Kaikei. They are fairly traditional and show a certain delicateness. The works Unkei sculpted around 1210 for the Hokuendō (North Octagonal Hall) at Tōdai-ji, on the other hand, are indicative of his fully developed style. By this time, Unkei had begun to stress realism over tradition and solid, muscular forms over ephemeral, delicate ones.

Unkei's Miroku Butsu is in the tradition of previous Buddha figures, including those of his father and ultimately Tori Busshi. Like the works of those sculptors, the Buddha is depicted as seated and backed by an intricate halo. However, Unkei's work features further strides toward realism. Crystal inlays cause the eyes to shine, and details are carved deeply and in new detail. Furthermore, Unkei's work does not follow the canon of proportions established by Jōchō in the Heian period. Unkei's figure instead has a long torso that does not match the distance between the figures knees (a style used by sculptors for the preceding 150 years). Despite this, Unkei's Buddha does not look unbalanced or unwieldy. Rather, it is a lifelike Buddha who seems kind and empathic. In essence, Unkei created a new style of sculpture.

This new realism is especially evident in Unkei's non-Buddha statuary. His Kongō Rikishi guardians stand contrapposto with dramatic stances. Their musculature, though anatomically incorrect, is well detailed, making them appear to be in mid-movement. These Niō reflect the warrior lifestyle and samurai ideals to which Unkei was exposed in Kamakura.

Unkei's rakan figures, Mujaku and Seshin, take this realism to an even higher level, making the figures appear almost portrait-like. Both statues sport priestly vestments that frame their bodies realistically. They stand life-size and alone and are fully sculpted in the round as if intended to be viewed from any angle. Mujaku is depicted as a thin man manipulating some sort of holy, cloth-wrapped object. He appears reserved and reflective. Seshin, in contrast, is depicted in mid conversation, gesturing and speaking, an extroverted counterweight to the solemn Mujaku. The men are shown as specific people, not simply members of a stock type.

Due to the collaborative nature of sculpture in this period, it is difficult to determine exactly how much of this innovation can be credited to Unkei personally. Regardless of who was responsible, this new style was adopted by Unkei's followers and descendants, including his sons Tankei, Kōun, Kōben, and Kōshō, and carried on until the mid-Kamakura period. Kōben and Kōshō especially would take Unkei's style to new extremes.

== Gallery ==
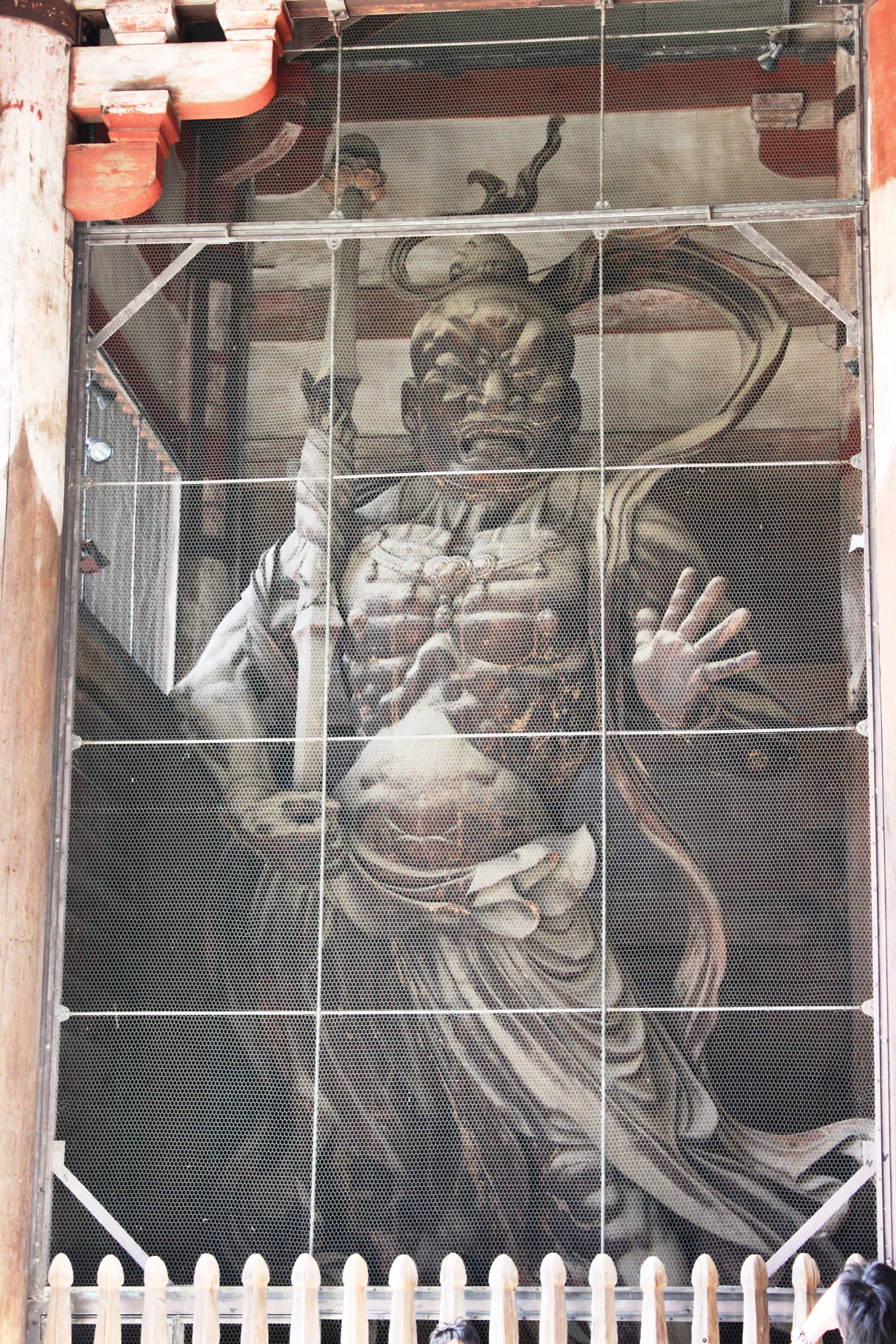
Agyō, Tōdai-ji, with Kaikei and 13 assistant sculptors. 1203. National Treasure

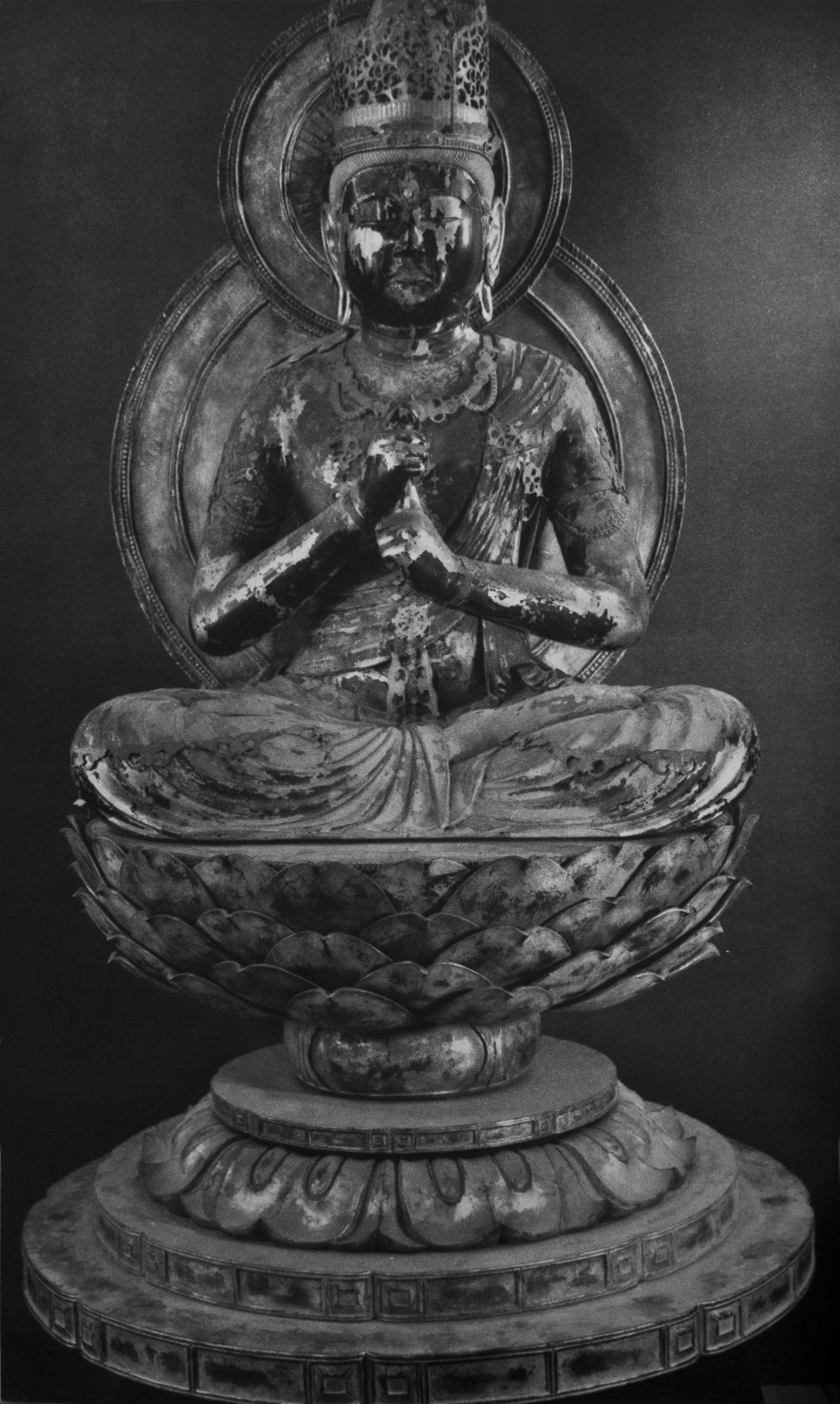
Dainichi Nyorai at Enjō-ji, 1176, National Treasure

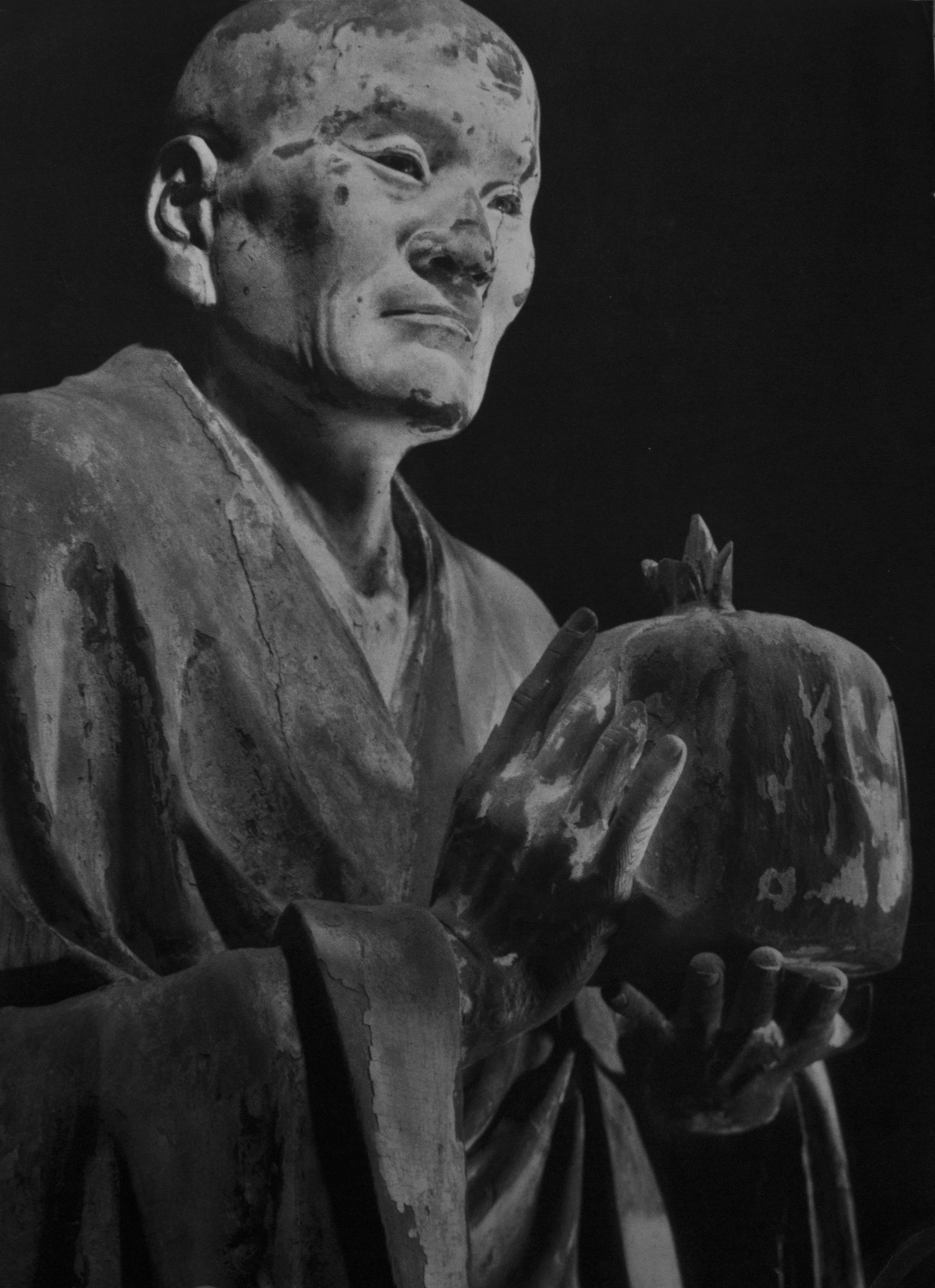
Muchaku at Kōfuku-ji, 1212, National Treasure

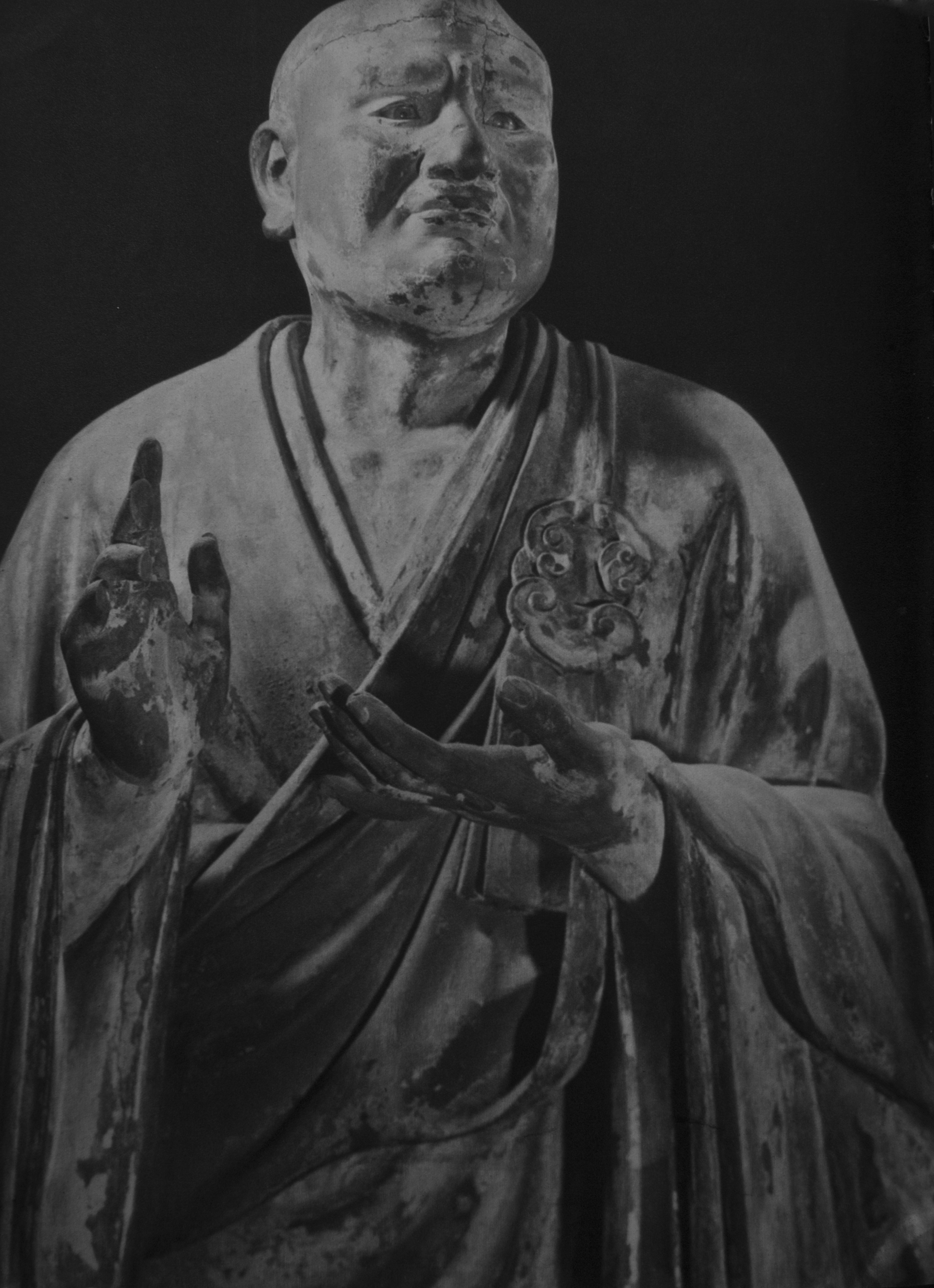
Seshin at Kōfuku-ji, 1212, National Treasure

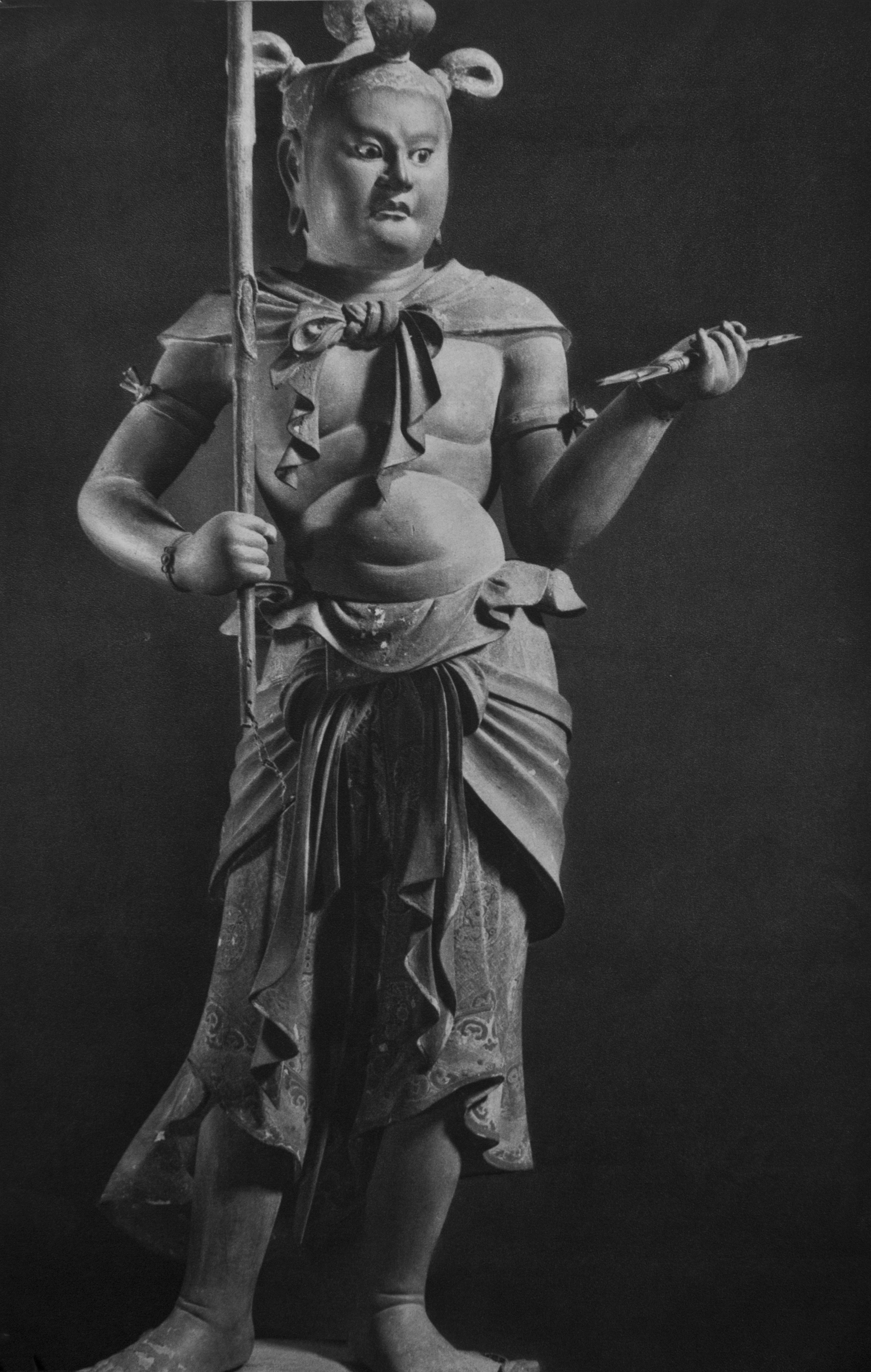
Seitaka Dōji at Kongōbu-ji, National Treasure

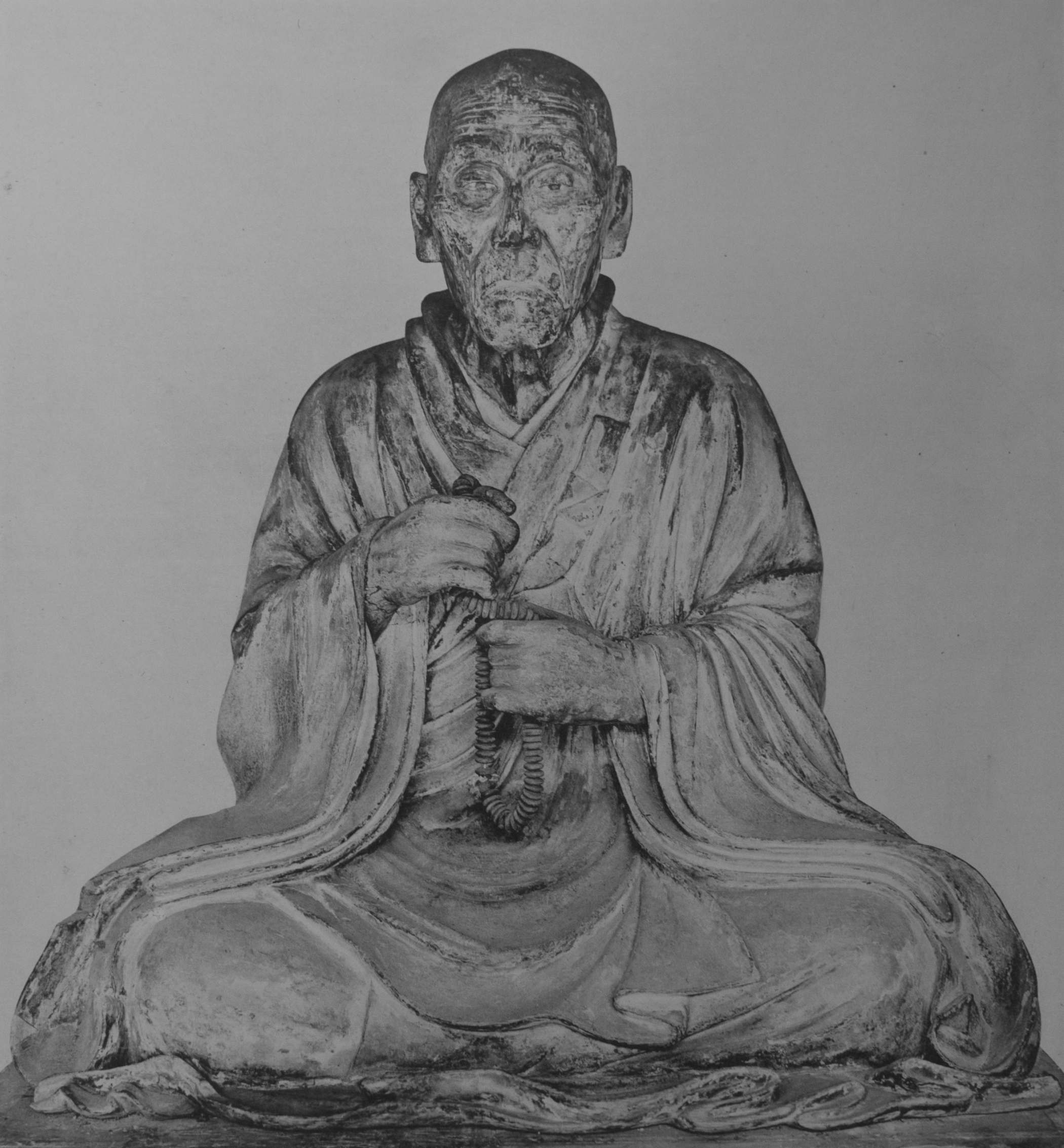
Chōgen at Todai-ji, National Treasure

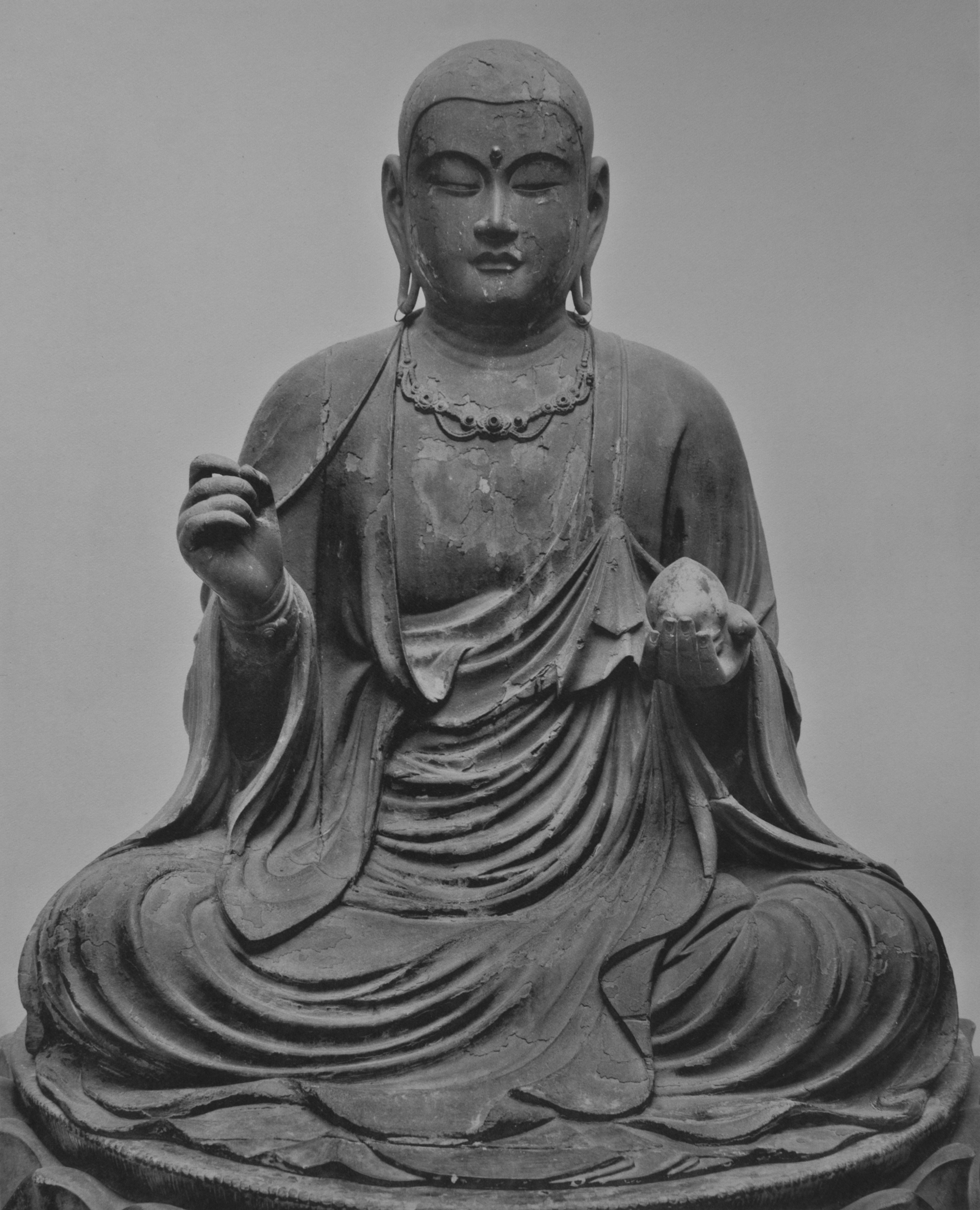
Zizō Bosatsu at Rokuharamitsu-ji, Important Cultural Property

== See also ==
- List of National Treasures of Japan (sculptures)
- Dainichi Nyorai
- Kei school
