= Hibutsu =

Japanese Buddhist icons concealed from public view

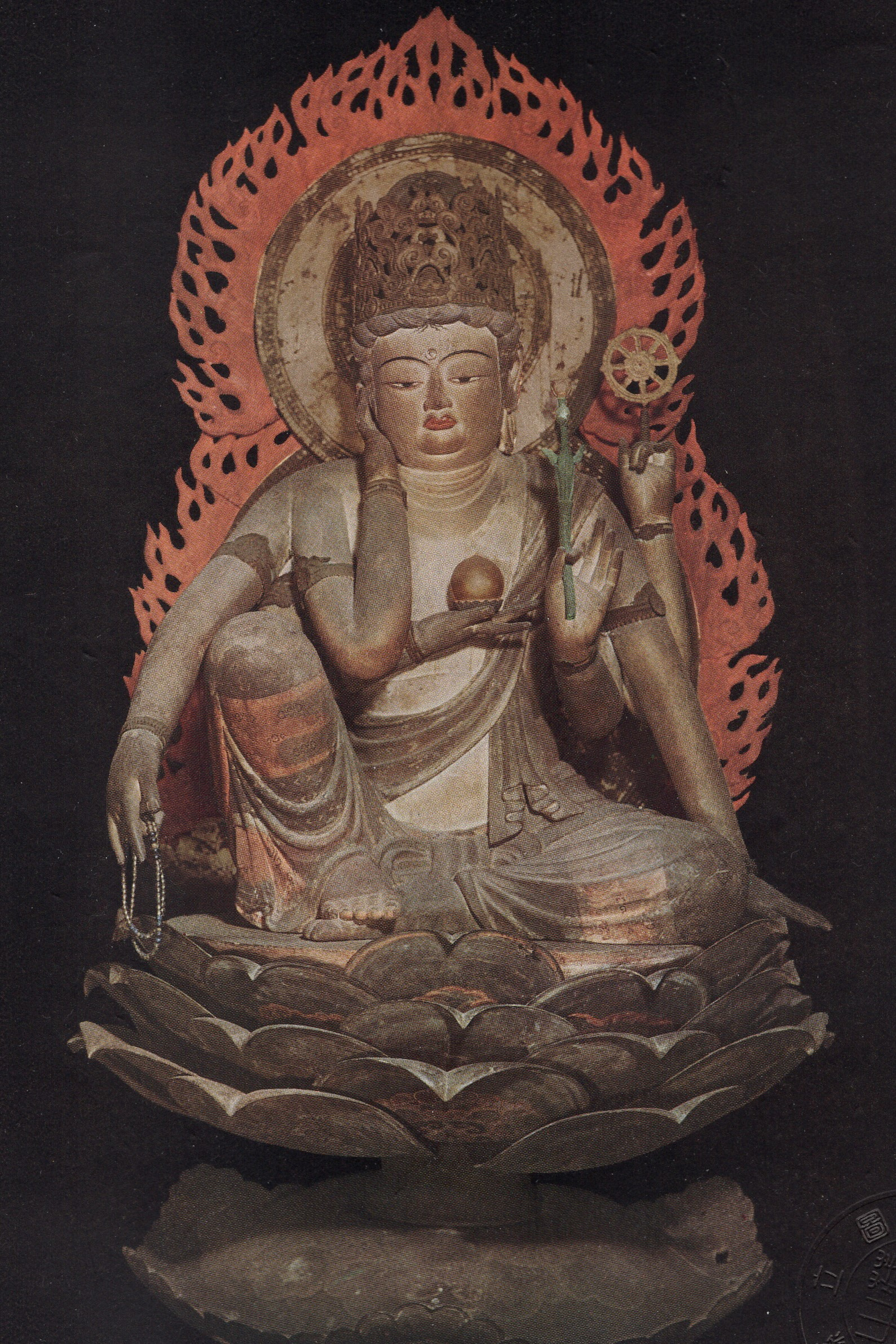
Statue of Kannon Nyoirin Kannon of Kanshin-ji in Kawachinagano is a hibutsu and is open to public viewing annually on 17 - 18 April

Hibutsu (秘仏; 'hidden Buddhas') are Japanese Buddhist icons or statues concealed from public view. Hibutsu are generally located within Buddhist temples in shrines called zushi (厨子; "miniature shrines"). They are unavailable for viewing or worship except for certain religious ceremonies. It is possible in some cases for the hibutsu to be viewed in exchange for an offering to the temple. Some hibutsu, such as the wooden statue of Gautama Buddha at Seiryō-ji or the Amida statuary at Zenkō-ji, are almost never displayed, even to initiates of the temples in which they are held (such examples are called zettai hibutsu). Others are put on public display rarely, in a ceremony called kaichō (開帳; "opening the curtain").

== History ==
Whilst the practice of concealing important religious artefacts within zushi or behind curtains dates to the Heian period, the hibutsu came slightly later. It is possible that the original practice was based on the Shinto concept of kami (神; "gods") without physical form, however a document from Kōryū-ji indicates that it began at that temple with the concealment of a statue of Kannon imported from Silla in 616. The earliest record of an actual hibutsu dates from 1106, when sources indicate the Amida statues at Zenkō-ji were briefly put on display. By the Edo period hibutsu had become a popular concept in Japanese Buddhism, and during this time kaichō ceremonies became major public events, drawing crowds of thousands. Art historian Shiro Ito notes that hibutsu are a uniquely Japanese phenomenon; other Buddhist cultures do not have any equivalent practice.

The concealment of hibutsu is intended to emphasise their potency and transcendence. It may also serve to protect them from pollution by the impure influences of the mundane world, or to preserve the personal privacy of these "living" embodiments of Buddhism.

Liza Dalby's novel Hidden Buddhas is based on the concept of hibutsu.
