= Standing Twelve Heavenly Generals (Tokyo National Museum) =

Japanese Sculptures

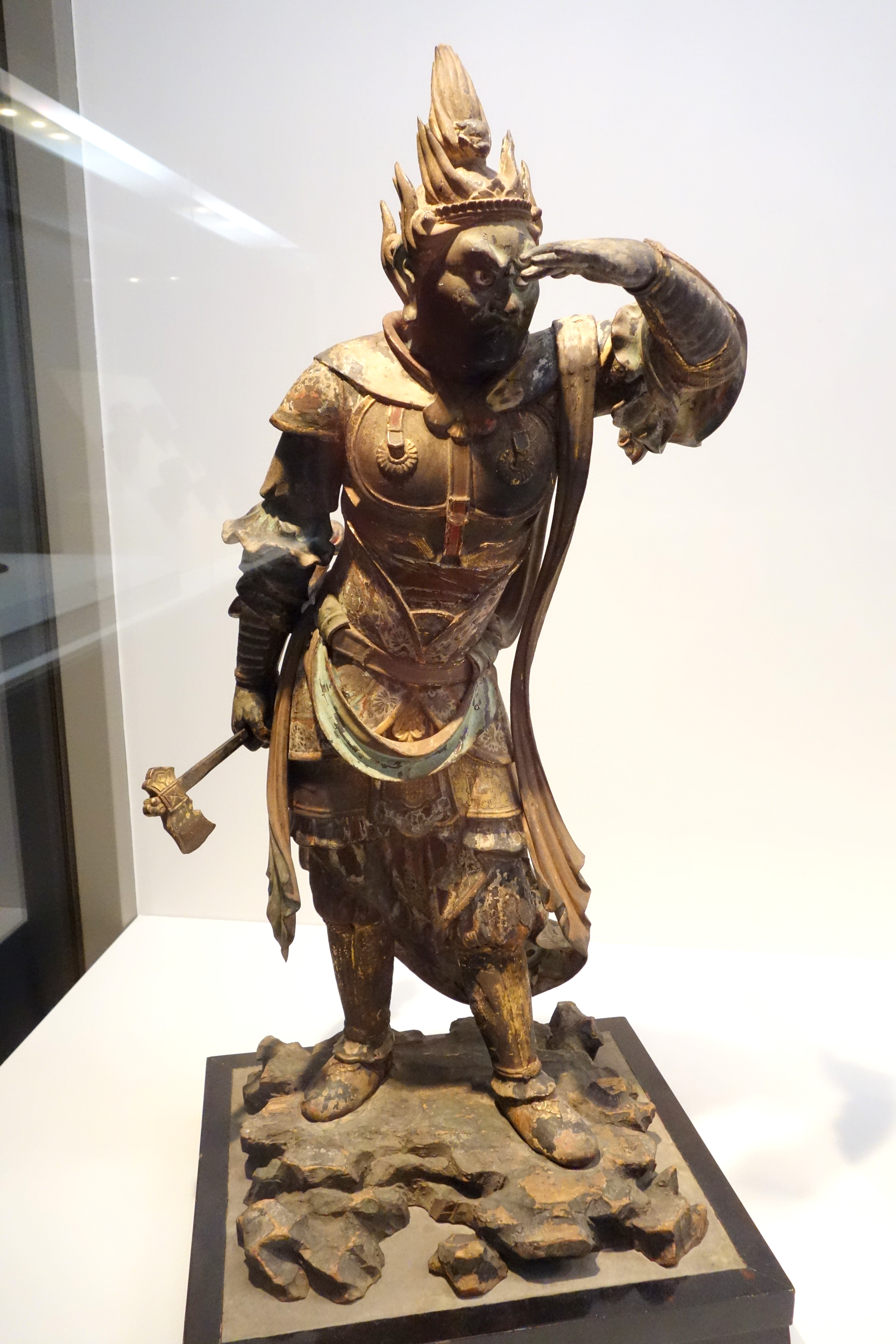
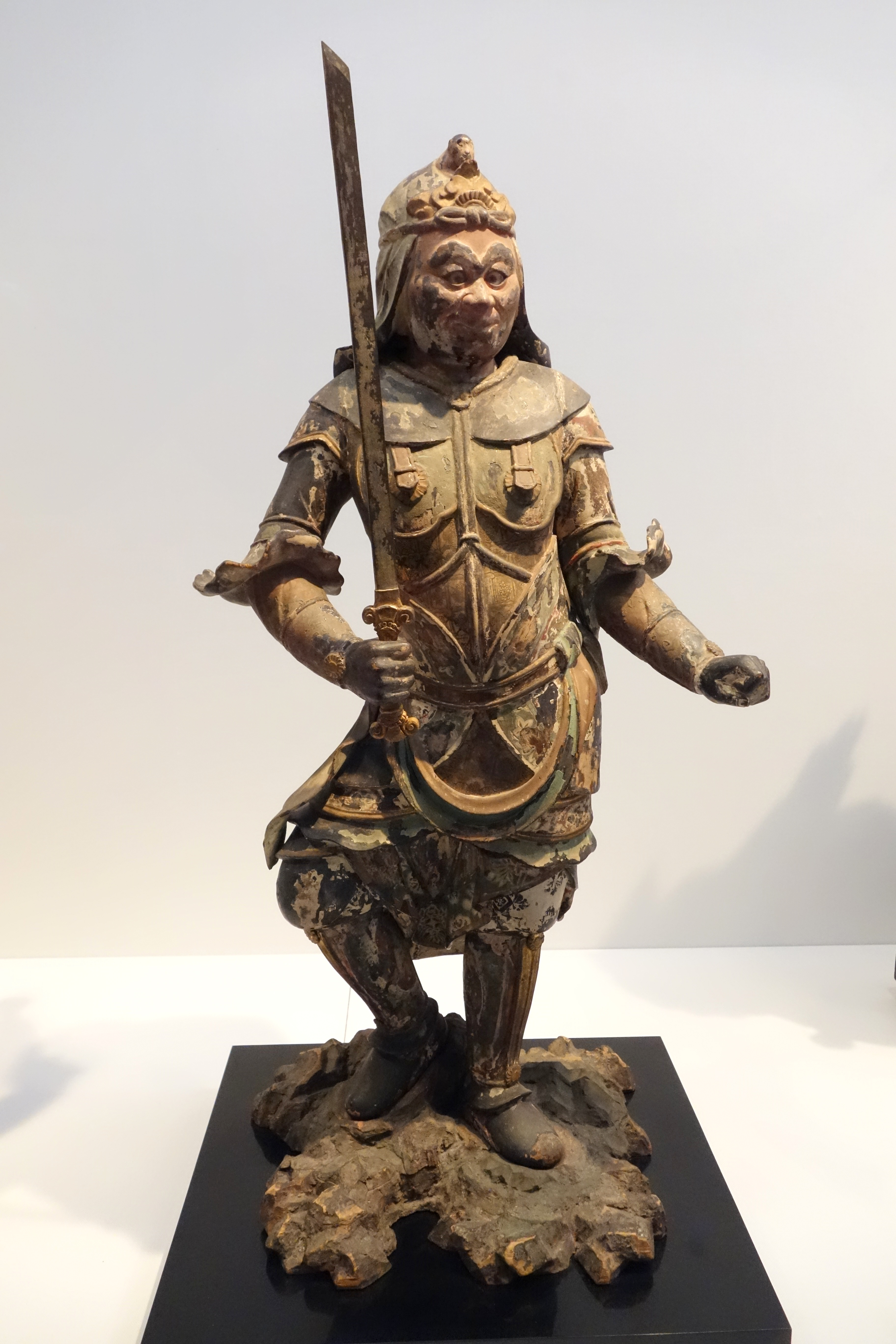
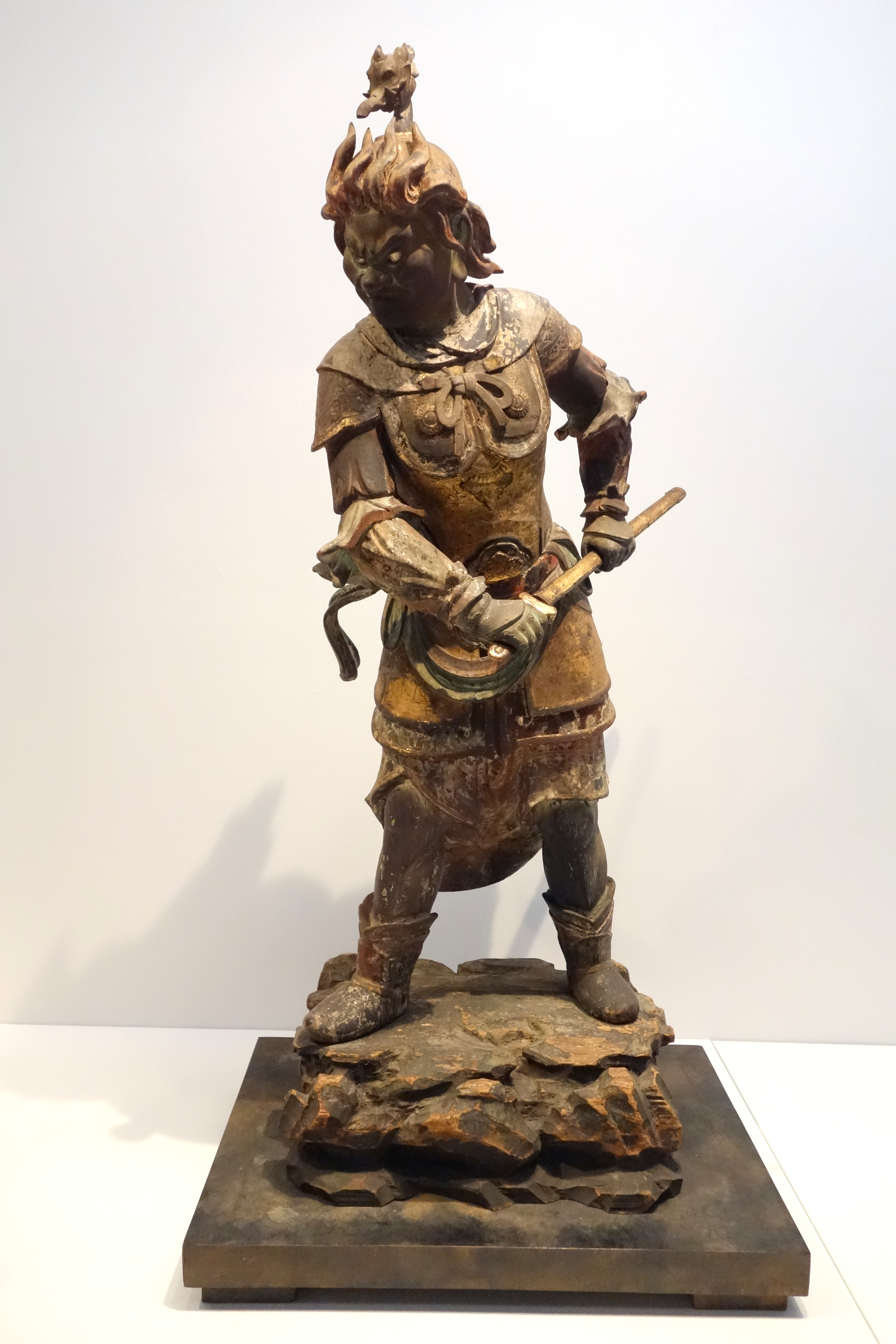
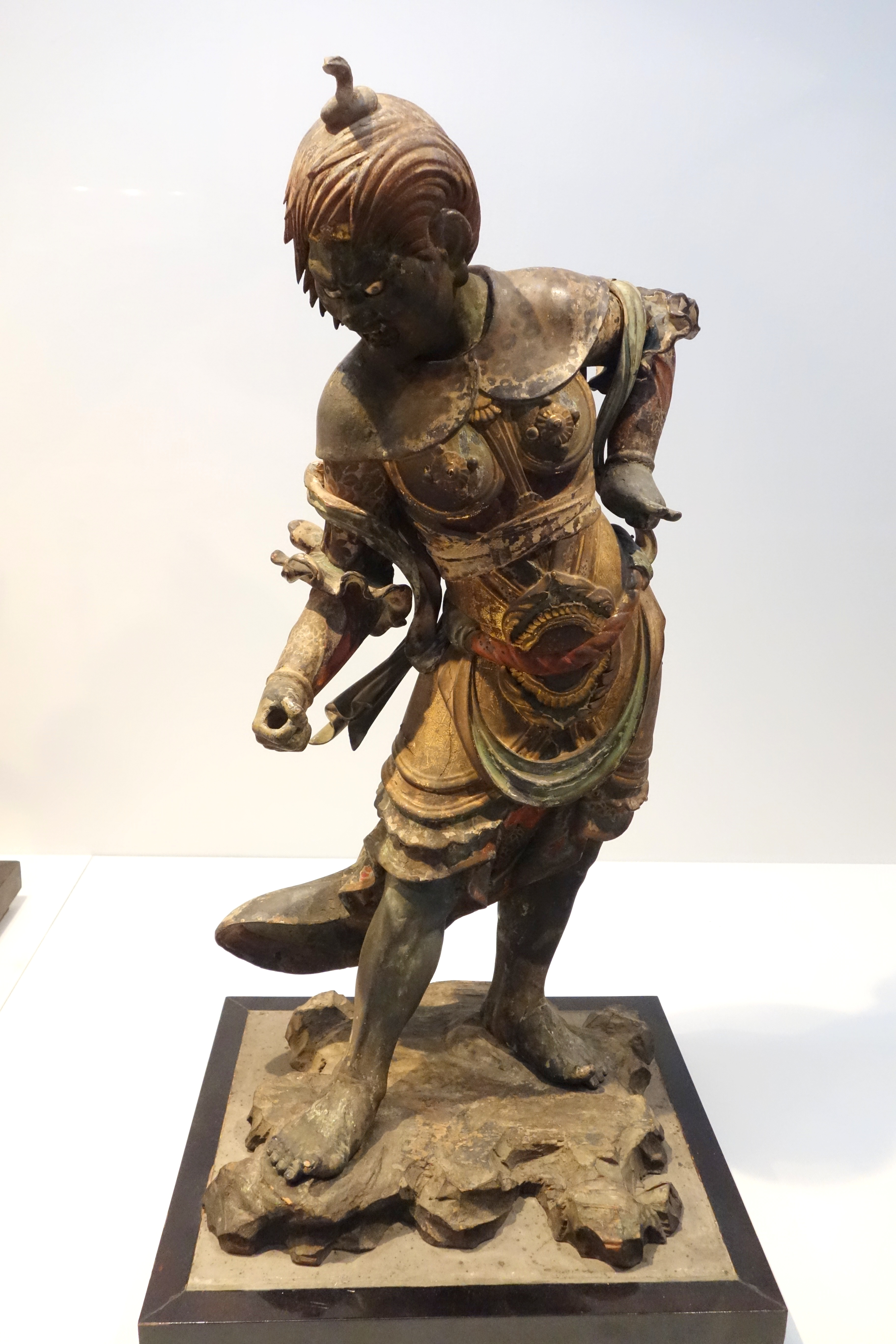
- Artist: Unknown
- Year: 13th century (Kamakura period)
- Catalogue: C-15-16, C-1852-1853, C-1878 (TNM catalogue)
- Type: 5 wooden sculptures, polychromy, partly coated with thin gold strips, beaded eyes
- Dimensions: 78.2, 71.3, 69.5, 75.3 and 70.9 cm
- Designation: Important Cultural Property
- Location: Tokyo National Museum, Tokyo, Japan

Standing Twelve Heavenly Generals (十二神将立像) is a set of five anonymous wooden sculptures from the 13th century depicting the Twelve Heavenly Generals, now part of the collection of the Tokyo National Museum. Together with the other seven figures of the set (owned by the Seikadō Bunko Art Museum), they are designated Important Cultural Properties.

The Twelve Heavenly Generals, also known as Twelve Divine Generals or Juni Shinsho, are the protective deities, or yaksha, of Bhaisajyaguru (Tathagata), the buddha of healing and medicine in Mahāyāna Buddhism. They are also considered to protect its believers. Each sculpture has his own symbol, following the Chinese zodiac signs. The ones at the Tokyo National Museum are the Dragon, Sheep, Snake, Dog and Monkey Generals.

The Heavenly Generals, always shown with a fierce look, wearing armor and carrying weapons, were often the subject of sculptures during the Heian and Kamakura periods. In fact, five different sets of Heavenly Generals have been designated as National Treasures. In the group of figures at the Seikadō Bunko and Tokyo National Museums, the uniqueness of each one of the figures has been praised, with "varied postures, hairstyles, hand-held symbols and armor shapes". According to the National Institutes for Cultural Heritage,

"While their dynamic motion is fully captured without exaggeration, their armor and clothes are represented by delicate coloring. The brilliant coloring and use of kirikane (a technique to cut gold leaf into small pieces and paste it on a surface) patterns suggest that the person (or persons) making the votive offering for the creation of these deities had ample means."

Dated from the Kamakura period (1185-1333), it is believed that these sculptures were enshrined in the Jōruri-ji temple of the school of Pure Land Buddhism in Kizugawa, Kyoto Prefecture. It is also suspected that the sculptures were a votive offering made by a nobleman, and that the sculptors might belong to the famous Kei school of Buddhist sculpture that emerged in the early Kamakura period, and produced renowned artists such as Unkei, Kōkei, and Kaikei.

They are now part of the collection of the Tokyo National Museum in Tokyo, where they are kept and exhibited occasionally. The last time they were on display was from January 2 to April 17, 2016, in Room 11 of the Honkan (Japanese Gallery) (only three of the figures, the Snake, Dog and Monkey Generals).

The remaining seven sculptures from the set of twelve are owned by the Seikadō Bunko Art Museum in Setagaya, Tokyo. They are also designated Important Cultural Properties.
