= Busshi =

A busshi (仏師) is a Japanese term for Buddhist artists who specialized in painting or sculpting images for Buddhist temples, predominantly in the Nara period. Painters were specifically known as e-busshi (絵仏師), whereas sculptors who worked with wood were called ki-busshi. Busshi were organized into both categories of task and grade of mastery: sō-busshi (惣仏師, master) dai-busshi (大仏師, major), gon-busshi (権仏師, assistant), tō-busshi (頭仏師, supervisor), and shō-busshi (小仏師, apprentice). These rank designations continued in use until the Heian period.

== Practices ==
In both the Nara and Heian periods, busshi were organized in bussho (仏所, workshops) that belonged to the imperial court, temples, and the nobility. From the 10th century, the workshops became independent from temples and began working on commission. The bussho workshops disappeared entirely during the Edo period.

== List of Busshi ==
- Chōkai (ja)
- Chōsei (ja)
- Eikai (ja)
- Enkū
- Ensei (ja)
- Genkei (ja)
- Gyōkai (ja)
- Higo Bettō Jōkei (ja)
- Inchō (ja)
- Injo (ja)
- Inkaku (ja)
- Inkichi (ja)
- Inson (ja)
- Jōchō
- Jōkaku (ja)
- Jōkei
- Kaikei
- Kakuen (ja)
- Kakujo (ja)
- Kōben (ja)
- Kōen
- Kōkei
- Kōchō (ja)
- Kōjo (ja)
- Kochi no Obinari (ja)
- Kōshō (ja)
- Kōshō (ja)
- Kōun (ja)
- Kuninaka no Kimimaro (ja)
- Matsumoto Myōkei (ja)
- Myōen (ja)
- Raijo (ja)
- Seichō (ja)
- Tankei
- Tori Busshi
- Unga (ja)
- Unjo (ja)
- Unkei
- Yamaguchi no Ōguchi (ja)
- Zen'en (善円) or Zenkei (ja)
- Zenshun (ja)
- Zenzō (ja)
