= Kōen =

Head of the Kei School of Japanese Buddhist Sculptors

Kōen 康円
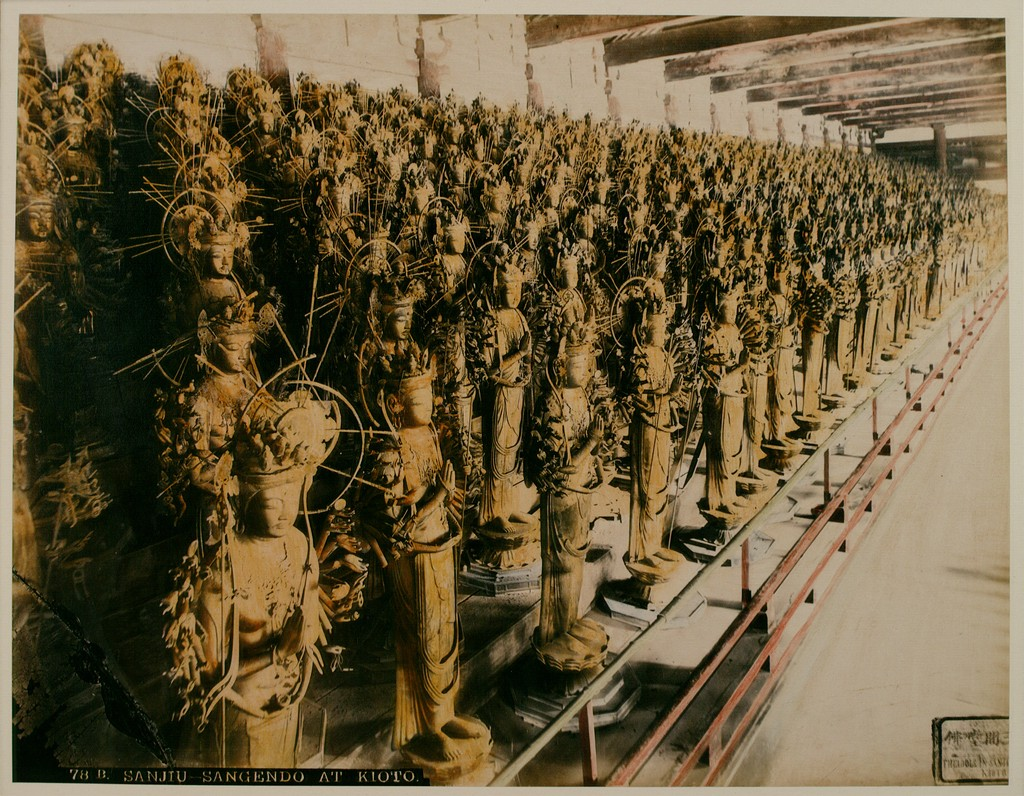
- Six statues of Kannon are attributed to Kōen
- Born: 1207
- Died: 1284-1285?
- Known for: Busshi
- Movement: Kei School

Kōen (Japanese: 康円; c. 1207 – 1285) was a Japanese Buddhist sculptor (busshi) of the Kei school in Nara during the Kamakura period. A grandson of the sculptor Unkei, and apprenticed by his uncle Tankei, he carried on the Kei school during the late Kamakura period, which is known for adding realism to Japanese Buddhist sculpture, which have reflected and influenced later periods of Buddhist art.

== Career ==
The Keiha is a multigenerational Buddhist art studio based out of Nara, responsible for the reconstruction and commissioning of several temples during the aftermath of the Genpei War under the support of the Kamakura shogunate.

With the lineage of sculptors starting with Jōchō, Kakujo, and Raijo, it was Kōkei who made the Keiha school prominent, followed by that of the sculptor Unkei and Kaikei. Unkei had six sons: Tankei, Kōun, Kōben, Kōshō, Unga, Unjo, who subsequently ran the studio.

Kōen, the son of Kōun, was born around 1207. In the early stages of his career, he was apprenticed to Tankei, and assisted in the creation of the central Senju Kannon statue at Sanjūsangen-dō, of which in addition, six of the one thousand Kannon statues are attributed to him.

In 1251, he acquired the titles of shō busshi and hōgen. When his uncle, Tankei, died in 1256, Kōen became head of the Kei school, acquiring the title of dai busshi.

He died approximately around 1284 or 1285, with 30 surviving works attributed to him.

== Significant Works ==
With 30 total works attributed to him, Kōen utilized the standard styles created by Unkei, which emphasized on realism and dynamic displays with bold poses, with examples including deep folds in the drapery of the statues.

- Jizō Bosatsu, Museum of East Asian Art (Cologne) (1249)
- Senju Kannon, Sanjūsangen-dō with Tankei (1254)
- Senju Kannon, Tōdai-ji (1256)
- Enma, Taizan-o, Shirokuzō, Shimeizō, Byakugō-ji (1259)
- Shitenno, Atami Art Museum (1267)
- Attendants to Jikoku-ten and Zochoten, Tokyo National Museum (1267)
- Fudo-Myo and his Eight Attendants, Kannon-ji, Tokyo (1272)
- Monju Bosatsu and Four Attendants, formerly Kōfuku-ji, Nakamura Collection,Tokyo (1273)
- Aizen Myoo, Jingo-ji (1275)
