= Jokei =

Jokei and Jōkei may refer to several Japanese individuals:

- Jōkei (monk) (1155–1212), a monk of the Hossō school of Buddhism during the Kamakura period
- Jōkei (sculptor) (late 11th century), a member of the Kei school of sculpture during the Kamakura period
- Sumiyoshi Jokei (1599–1670), a painter of the Edo period

It may also refer to a visual novel, or the anime based upon the visual novel:

- Jōkei (visual novel), an eroge by Silky's, distributed by ELF Corporation
