= Kei school =

Ancient Japanese school

The Kei school (慶派, Kei-ha) was a Japanese school (style) of Buddhist sculpture which emerged in the early Kamakura period (c. 1200). Based in Nara, it was the dominant school in Buddhist sculpture in Japan into the 14th century, and remained influential until the 19th. Art historian Joan Stanley Baker cites the Kei school's early works as the last highpoint in the history of Japanese sculpture.

== Background and history ==
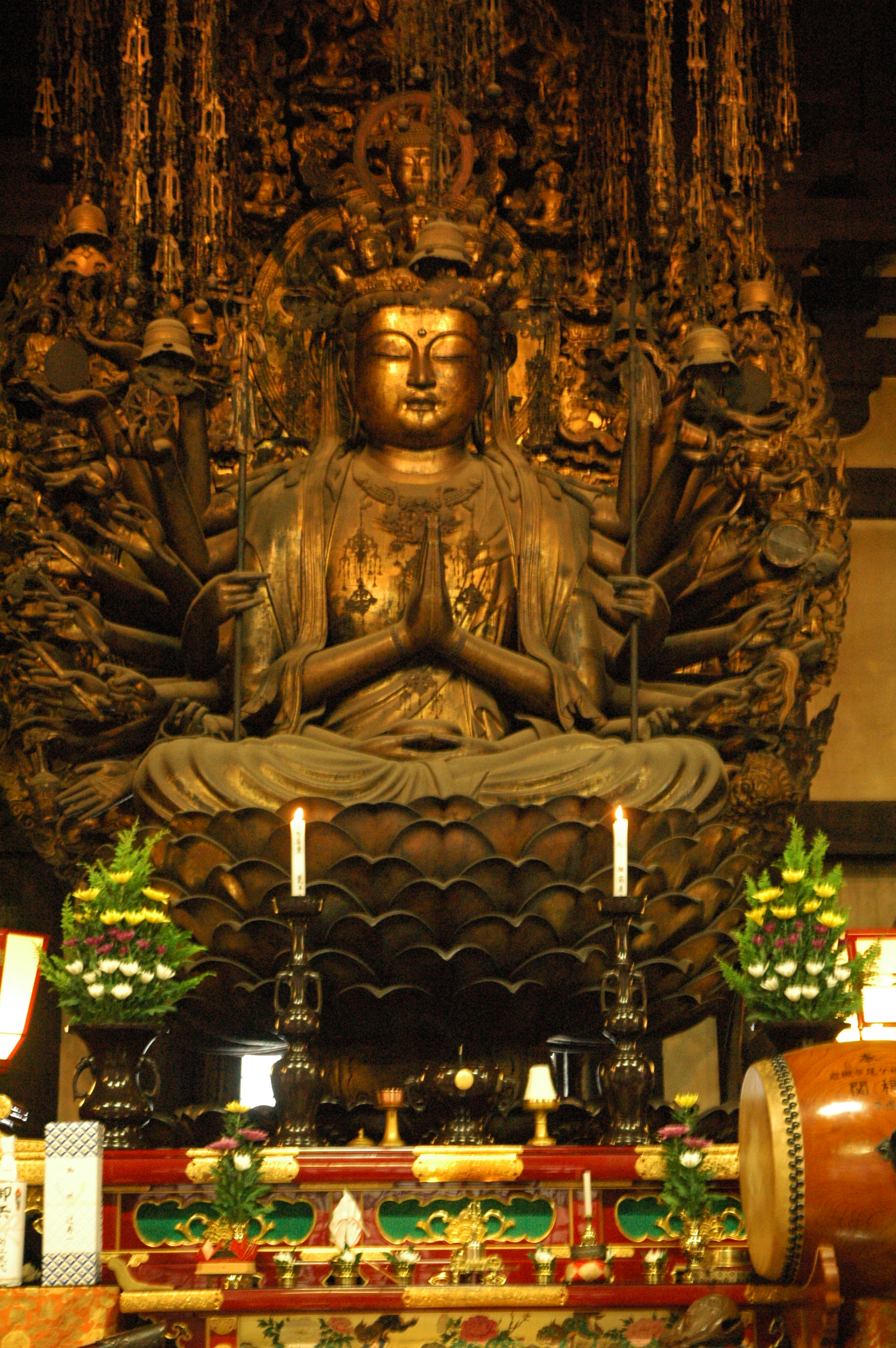
Senju Kannon by Tankei. Sanjūsangen-dō, 1254. National Treasure.

The Kei school developed out of that led by the busshi (Buddhist sculptor) Jōchō's successor, Kakujō and Kakujō's son Raijō, the leading sculptors of the preceding generations. These artists are sometimes said to have founded the Kei school; however, the school would not come into its own, and become associated with the name "Kei" until Raijō was succeeded by Kōkei and Unkei around the year 1200. Unkei's six sons and their descendants in turn later succeeded to leadership of the school.

Much of the cities of Nara and Kyoto were destroyed in the Genpei War of 1180-1185. The Kei school was granted the opportunity to restore Nara's greatest temples, the Tōdai-ji and Kōfuku-ji, replacing their Buddhist sculptures. The Kei school's strong and traditional style earned it the favor of the Kamakura shogunate; the school also lacked the Imperial political ties that the In school and En school had, and was thus selected by the shogunate for this honor, catapulting the school to great success and influence.

The Tōdai-ji restoration project lasted several generations, from roughly 1180 to 1212, and drew extensively on Tenpyō style in Nara period, introducing new stylistic elements while remaining true to tradition. New human iconographic forms emerged, with greater simplicity and realism, and more subdued colors. For the first time, crystals with dark centers were used for the eyes of statues; while the Kei school style recalls elements of Nara period sculpture, Joan Stanley Baker describes the Kei school works as less idealized, generic, and impersonal than Nara works. The sculptors of the Kei school focused on the distinctive identity of each statue's subject, and on physical details.

A late 12th century sculpture of Dainichi Nyorai, attributed to Unkei, sold at auction at Christie's on March 18, 2008 for US$14.37 million, establishing a new record for Japanese art prices at auction, as well as for Asian art sold in New York.

== Gallery ==
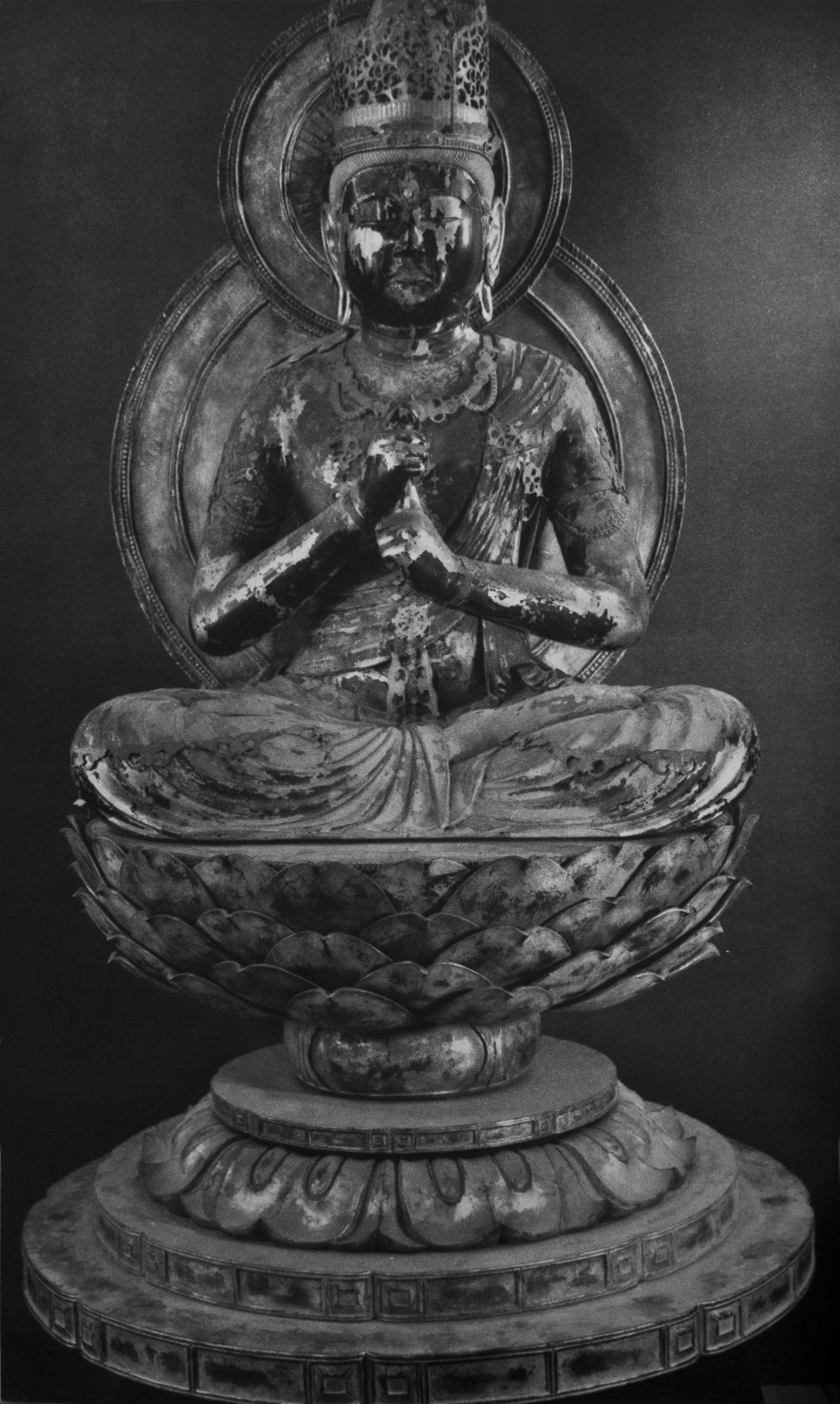
Dainichi Nyorai by Unkei, Enjō-ji, 1176, National Treasure

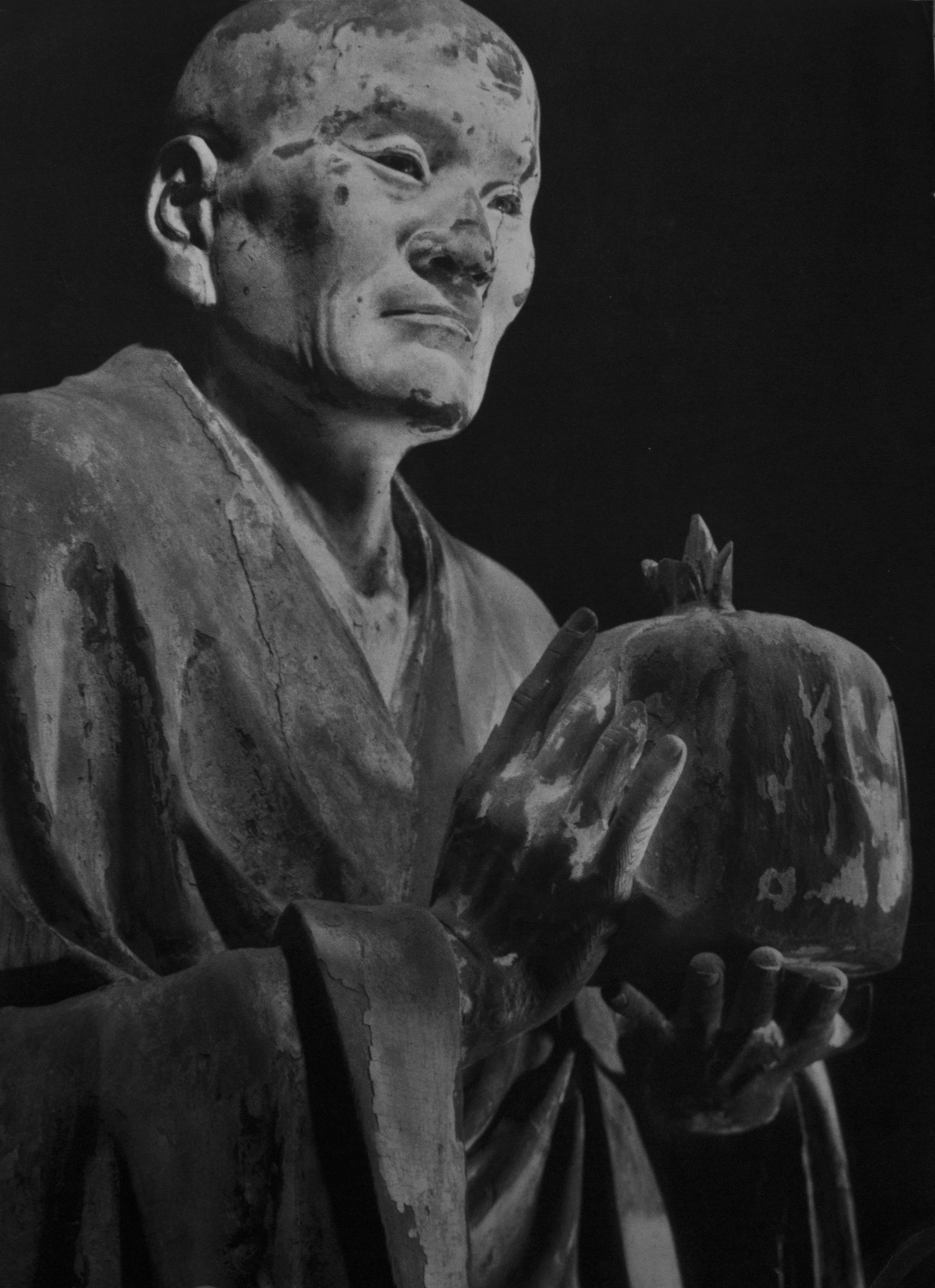
Muchaku by Unkei, Kōfuku-ji, 1212, National Treasure

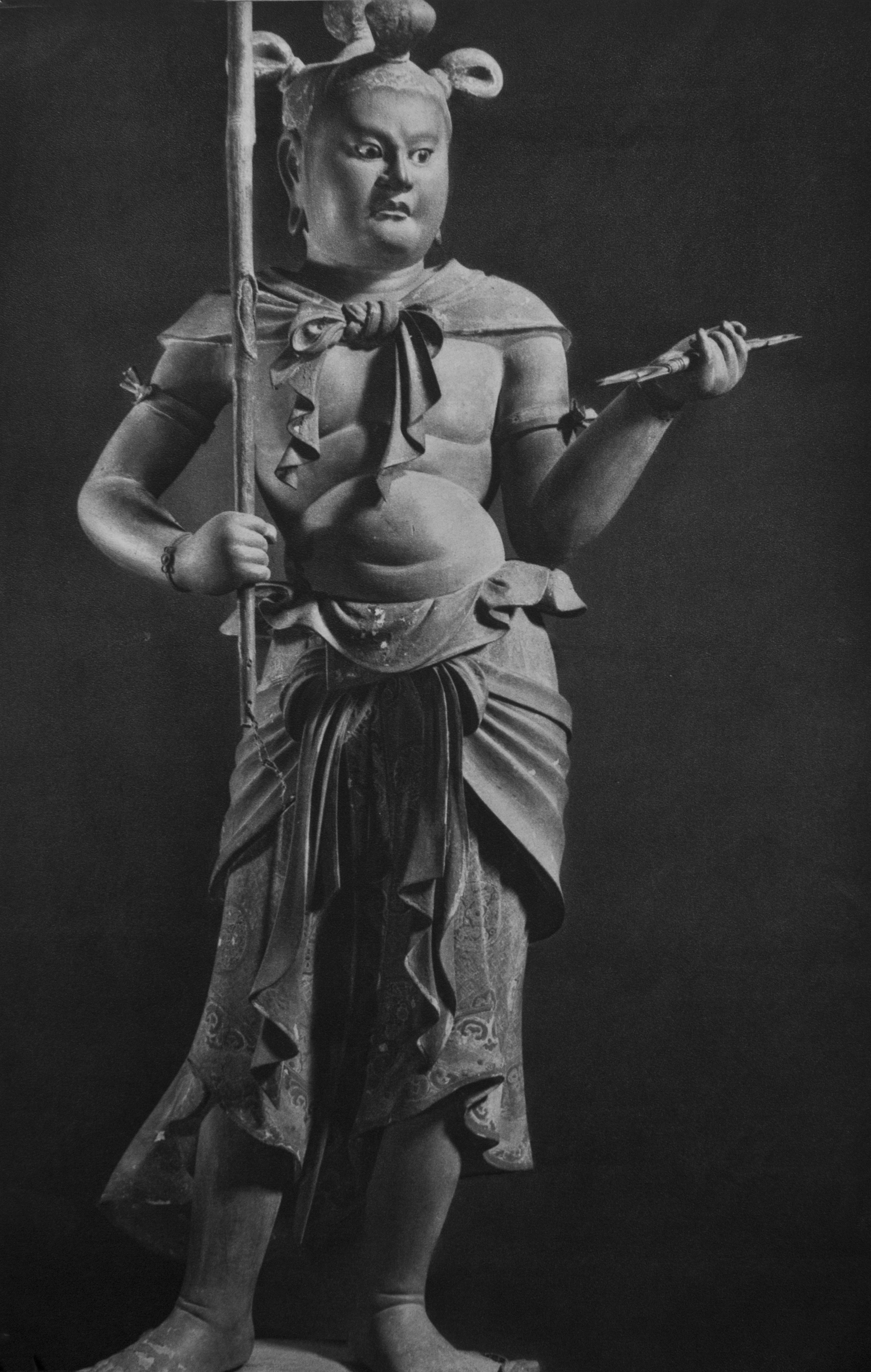
Seitaka Dōji by Unkei, Kongōbu-ji, National Treasure

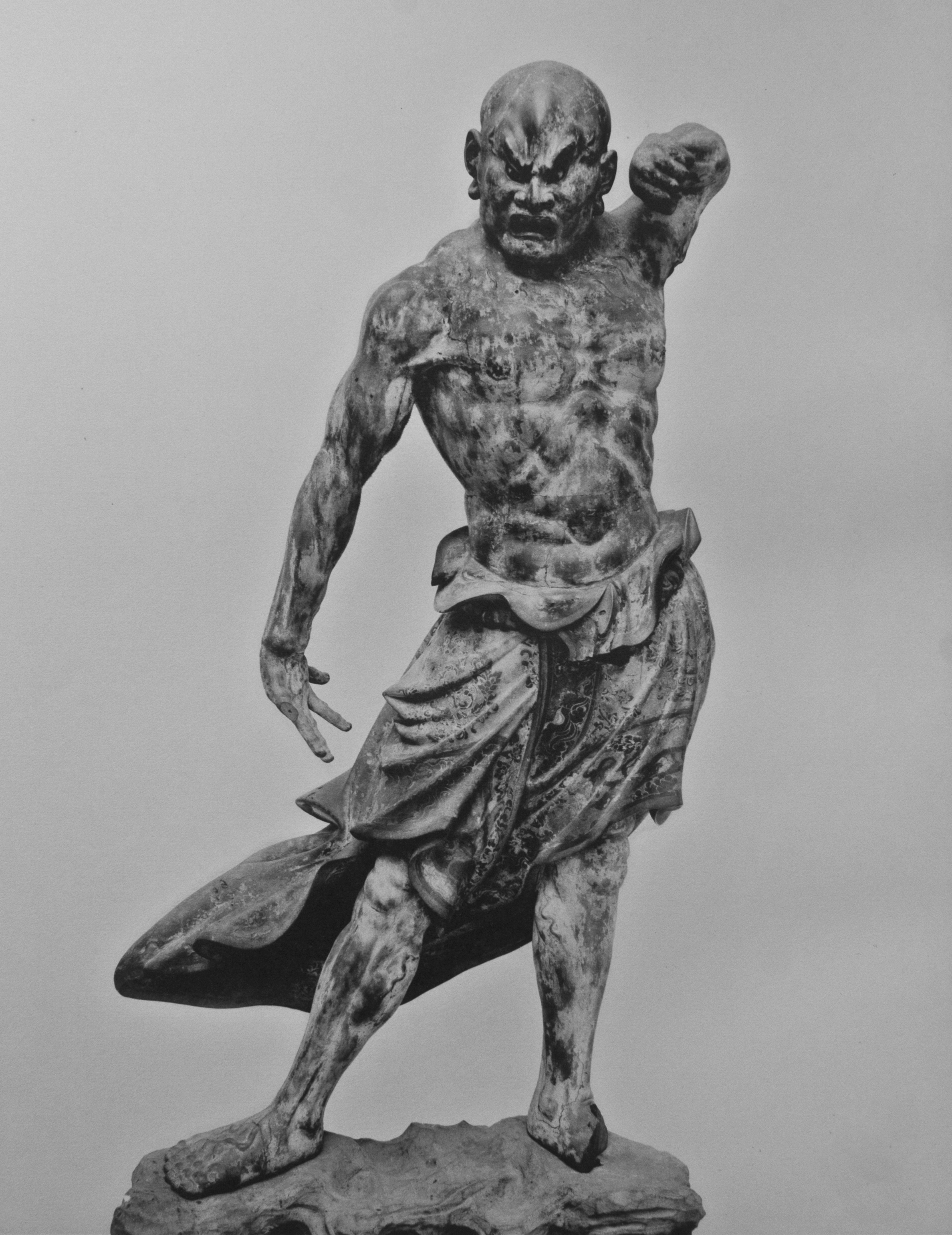
Kongō Rikishi, Kōfuku-ji, National Treasure

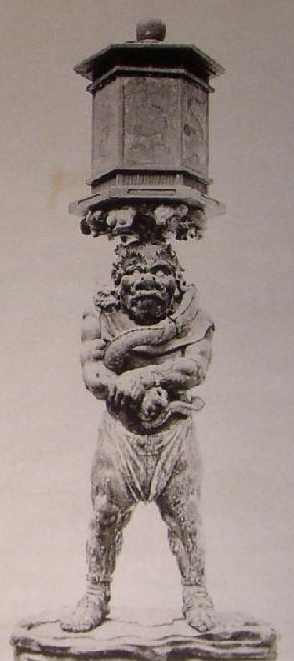
Ryūtōki by Kōben, Kōfuku-ji, 1215, National Treasure

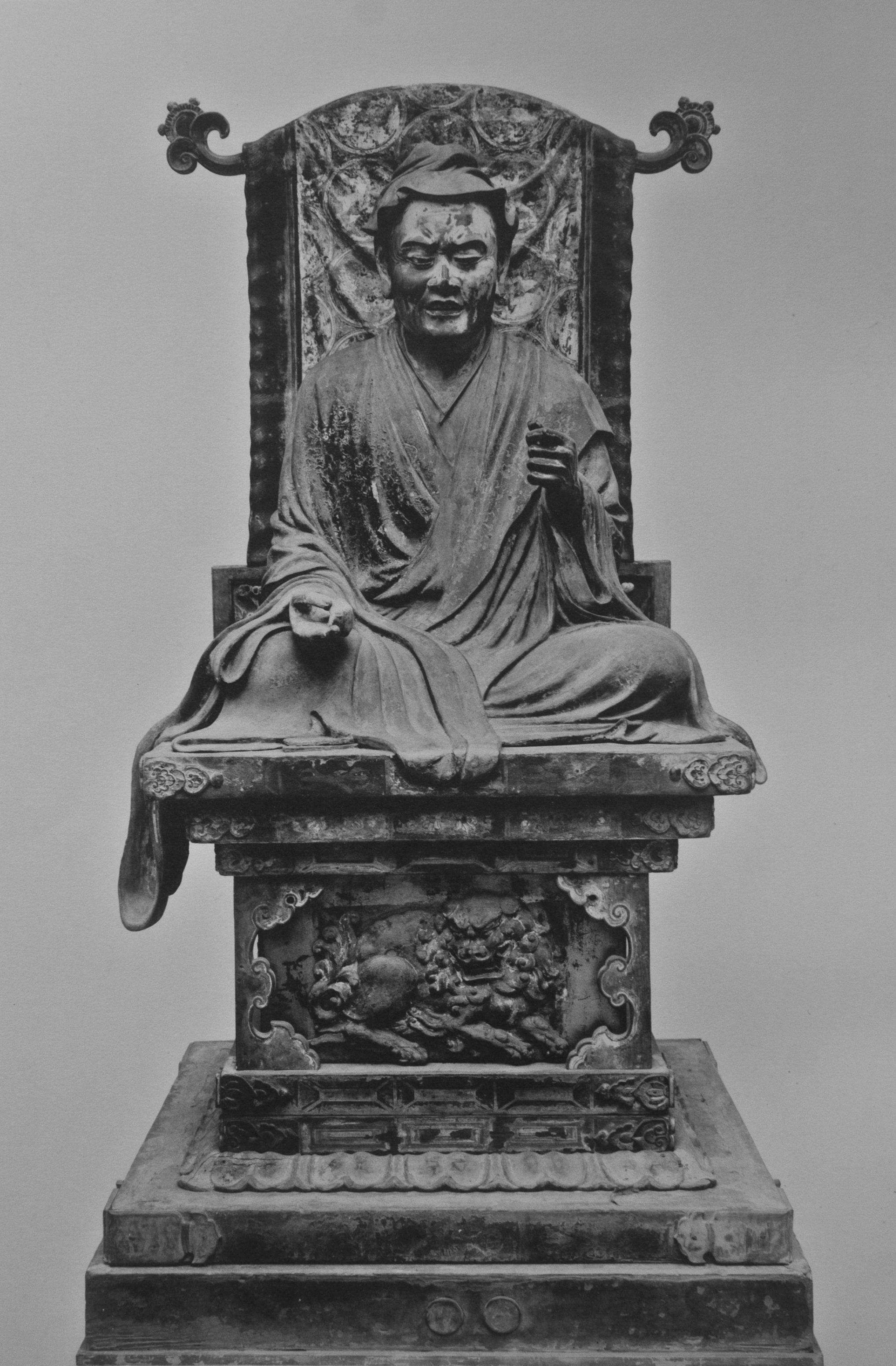
Yuima Koji by Jōkei, Kōfuku-ji, National Treasure

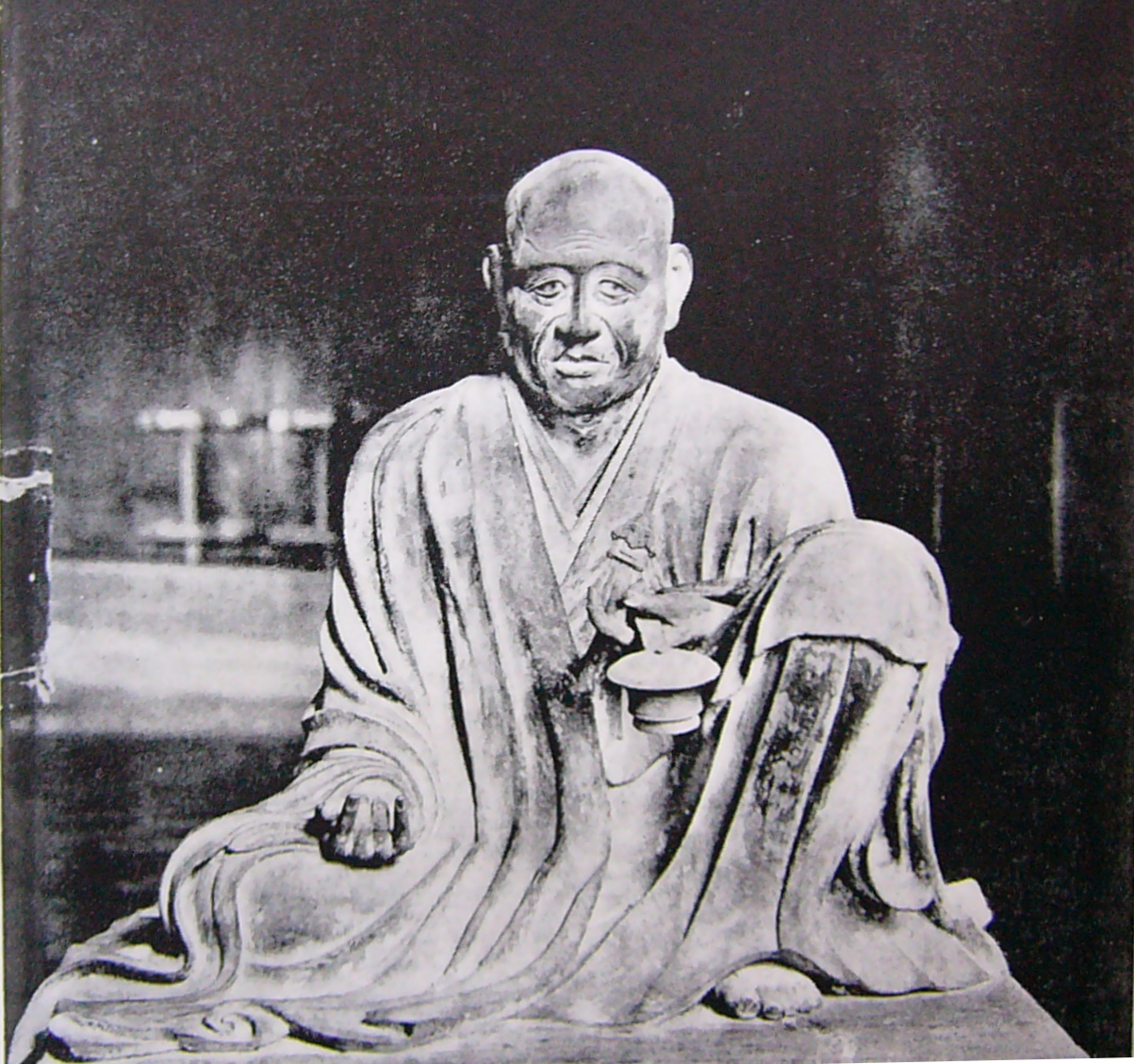
Six Patriarchs of the Hossō: Gyōga by Kōkei, 1189. Kōfuku-ji. National Treasure.

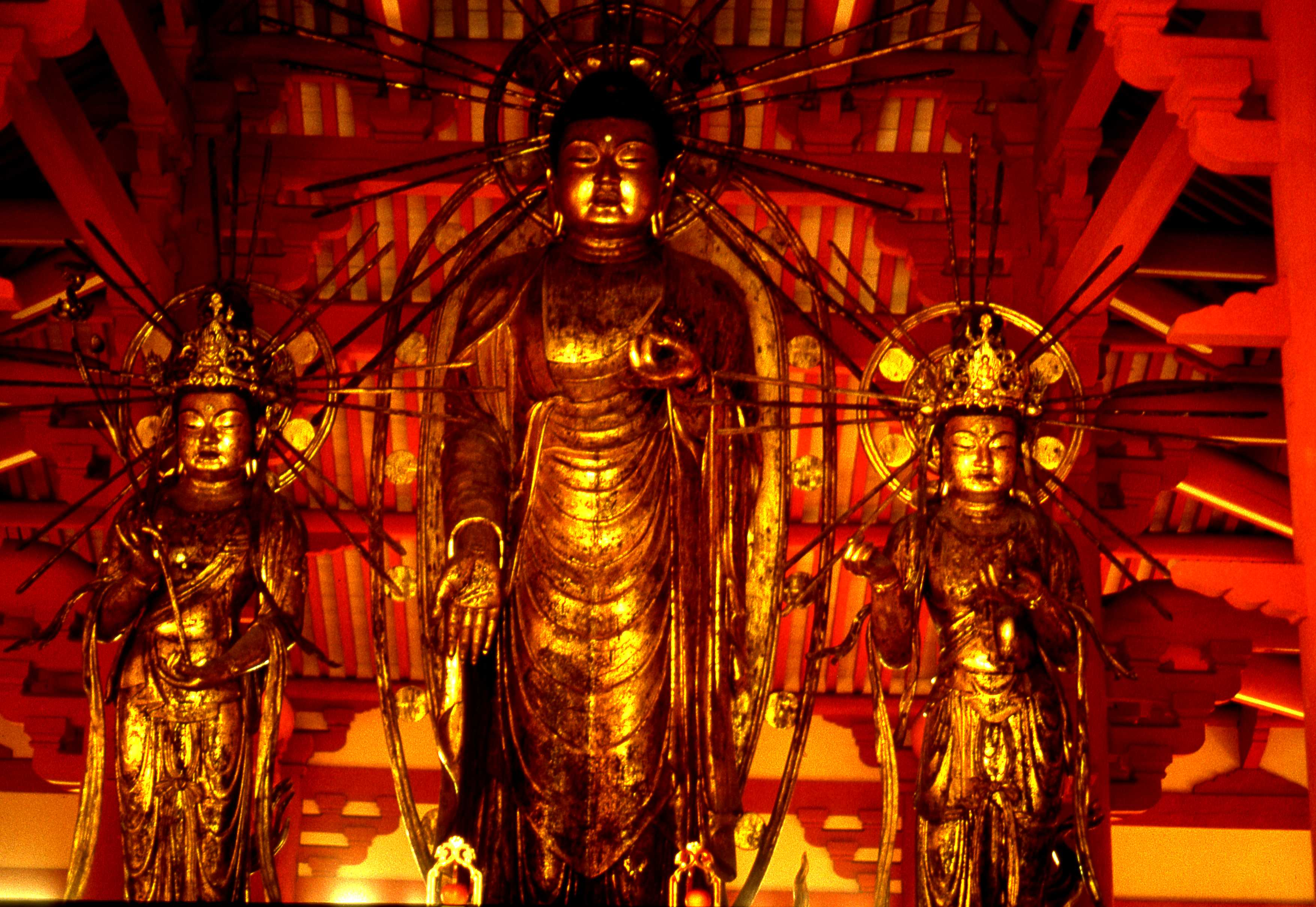
Amitābha by Kaikei. Jōdo-ji, 1195－1197. National Treasure.

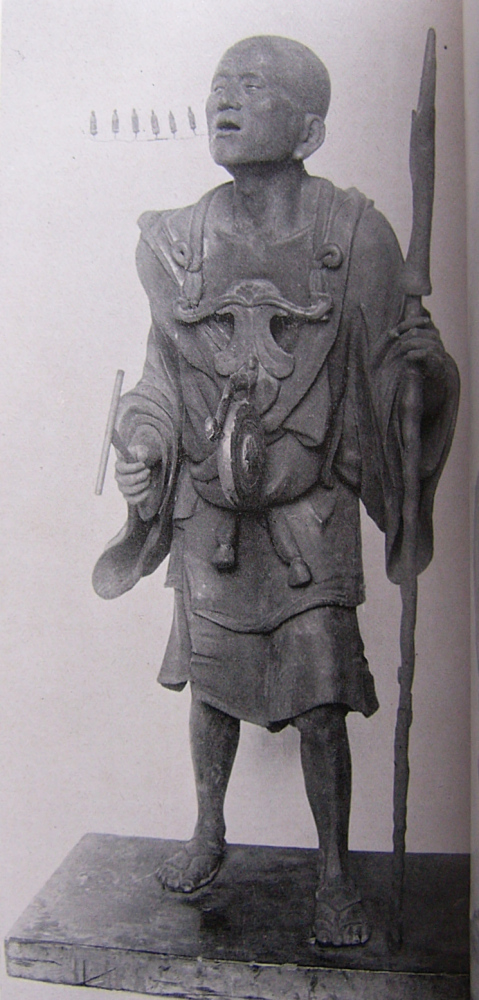
Portrait of monk Kūya by Koshō. Important Cultural Property

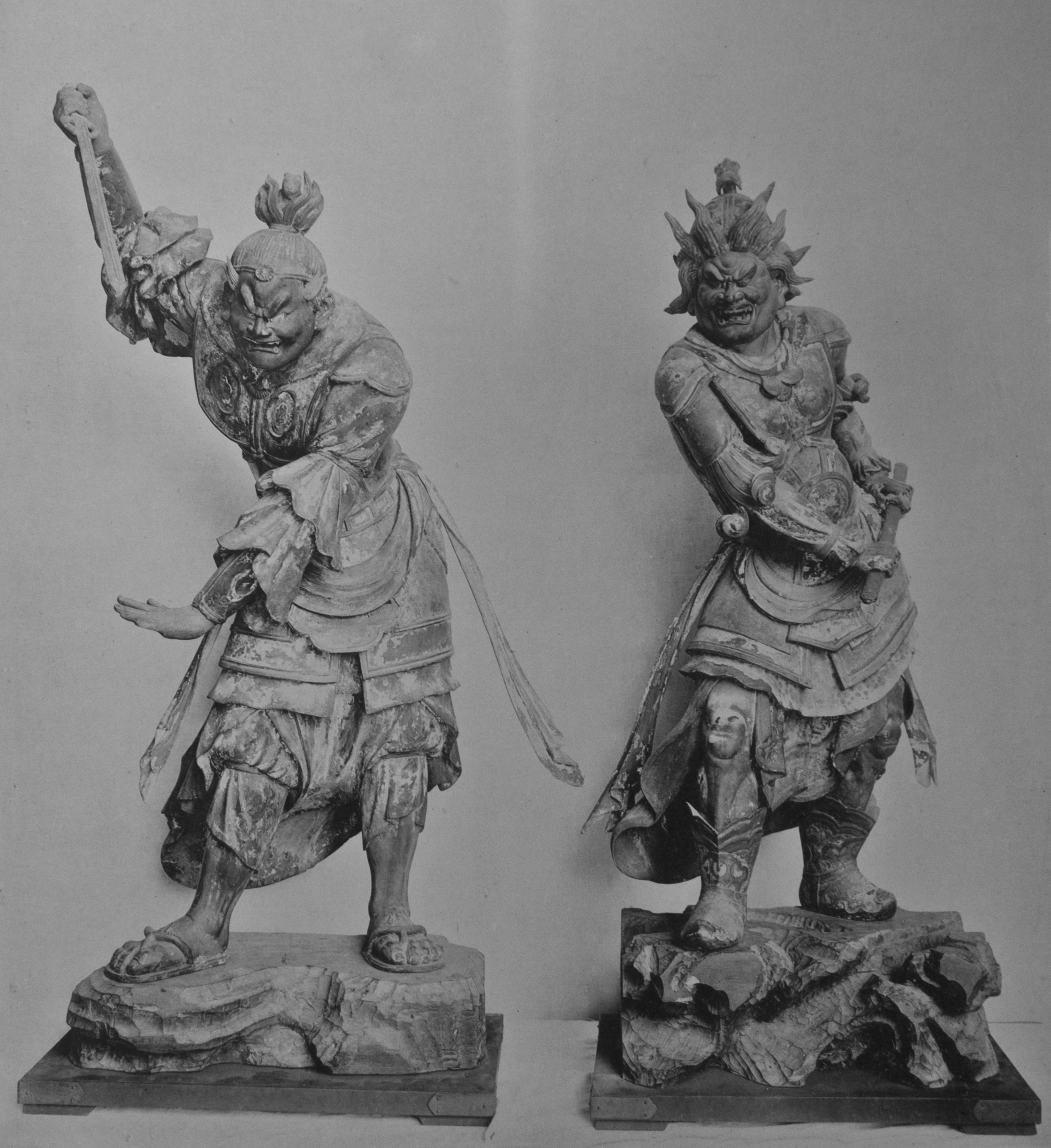
Twelve Heavenly Generals, Kōfuku-ji, 1207. National Treasure.

== Selected artists of note ==
- Kōkei
- Unkei
- Kaikei
- Tankei
- Kōen
