= Jōkei (sculptor) =

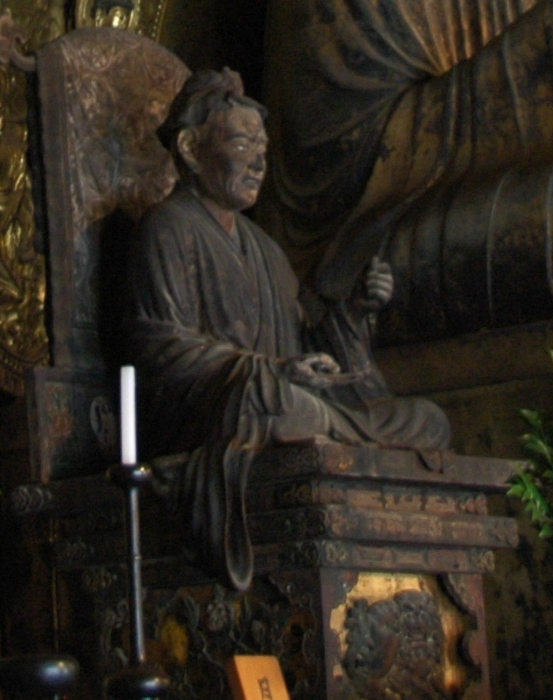
Sitting statue of Yuima by Jōkei, inside of the Eastern Golden Hall (東金堂, tōkon-dō) of Kōfuku-ji, designated as a National Treasure of Japan

Jōkei (定慶) was a Japanese sculptor of the Kei school, which flourished in the Kamakura period. Aside from his artwork, Jōkei left little record of his life, so sorting out the details of his biography is difficult. The fact that two men by that name were working in Nara in the 13th century only complicates matters.

Jōkei probably began his career as a disciple of Kōkei, the organizer of the Kei school of sculpture, or of Unkei. In fact, Jōkei may even have been Kōkei's son, though others call him the son of Unkei. In this capacity, he sculpted works for the reconstruction of the temples Kōfuku-ji and Tōdai-ji in Nara.

Jōkei followed the lead of Unkei and others in the Kei school in his pursuit of realism. An early example of this is his Guardian King (Niō), carved sometime in the 1190s. The figure stands beside another by Unkei at the main gateway in front of the Kōfuku-ji. Jōkei's Niō is nude to the waist, exposing a tense musculature. The veins in the neck and head are engorged, only heightening the figure's expression of rage. The pose is action-ortiented, as if the king is in the midst of a fight.

The figures of Yuima (Sanskrit: Vimalakirti) and Monju (Sanskrit: Manjushri) in the East kōndō of Kōfuku-ji also show Jōkei's interpretation of the Kei aesthetic. The debate between these two men had been the subject of earlier Japanese sculpture, but Jōkei's depiction is different and subject to interpretation. Some see his Yuima as strong and healthy, while others view the figure as aged and ill in keeping with his description in the Vimalikirtinirdesha Sutra. The work also indicates that Jōkei was familiar with the Buddhist sculpture of Song China. His Yuima sits on a pedestal, which is decorated with an elaborately carved lion. The sculpture's high wooden backing, carved to look as if it is covered in cloth, is another Chinese element. An inscription inside the chest portion of the work says that Jōkei worked on it in 1196 for 53 days. It lists Kōen, possibly his son, as the artist who did the coloration.
