= Twelve Heavenly Generals =

Yaksha of Bhaisajyaguru

In East Asian Buddhism, the Twelve Heavenly Generals or Twelve Divine Generals are the protective deities, or yaksha, of Bhaisajyaguru, the buddha of healing. They are introduced in the Medicine Buddha Sutra or Bhaiṣajyaguruvaidūryaprabharāja Sūtra. They are collectively named as follows:

- simplified Chinese: 十二神将; traditional Chinese: 十二神將; pinyin: Shí'èr Shén Jiāng
- Japanese: Jūni Shinshō (十二神将) or Jūni Shinnō (十二神王) or Jūni Yakusha Taishō (十二薬叉大将)

== Names of generals ==
The precise names of the generals seem to vary depending on tradition. Those listed below are from an available Sanskrit transcription of the Bhaiṣajyaguruvaiḍūryaprabhārāja Sūtra:

Sanskrit	Hanzi	Pinyin	Rōmaji	Vietnamese	Tagalog	Tibetan (Wly.)	Zodiac (Chinese)	Zodiac (Japanese)	Honji
Kiṃbhīra	宮毘羅	Guānpíluò; Jīnpíluò	Kubira; Kompira (Shinto)	Cung Tỳ La	Kimbhila	Ji 'jigs	Boar	Rat	Maitreya
Vajra	伐折羅	Fázhéluò	Basara, Bazara	Phạt Chiết La	Vajla	Rdo rje	Dog	Ox	Mahāsthāmaprāpta
Mekhila	迷企羅	Míqǐluò	Mekira	Mê Súy La	Mekhila	Rgyan 'dzin	Rooster	Tiger	Amitābha
Antila	安底羅	Āndǐluò	Anchira, Anteira	An Để La	Antila	Gza' 'dzin	Monkey	Rabbit	Avalokiteśvara
Anila	頞儞羅	Ènǐluò	Anira	Át Nể La	Anila	Rlung 'dzin	Sheep	Dragon	Mārīcī
Saṇṭhila	珊底羅	Shāndìluò	Sanchira, Santeira	San Để La	Santhila	Gnas bcas	Horse	Snake	Ākāśagarbha
Indala	因達羅	Yīndàluò	Indara	Nhân Đạt La	Indala	Dbang 'dzin	Snake	Horse	Kṣitigarbha
Pāyila	波夷羅	Bōyìluò	Haira	Bà Di La	Payila	Gtun 'dzin	Dragon	Sheep	Mañjuśrī
Mahāla	摩虎羅	Mòhǔluò	Makora	Ma Hổ La	Mahala	Sgra 'dzin	Rabbit	Monkey	Yamantaka
Cidāla	真達羅	Zhēndàluò	Shindara	Chân Đạt La	Sidala	Bsam 'dzin	Tiger	Rooster	Samantabhadra
Caundhula	招杜羅	Zhāodùluò	Shōtora	Chiêu Đổ La	Saundhula	'dzin	Ox	Dog	Vajrapāṇi
Vikala	毘羯羅	Píjiéluò	Bikara; Bigyara	Tỳ Yết La	Bikala	Rdzogs byed	Mouse	Boar	Śākyamuni

== Descriptions of each Heavenly General ==
=== Zhendaluo (真達羅) ===
Zhendaluo (真達羅) around 3m tall statue in Lingyin Temple, Hangzhou China	Short description about Zhendaluo

=== Zhaoduluo (招杜羅) ===
Zhaoduoluo (招杜羅) around 3m tall statue in Lingyin Temple, Hangzhou China	Short description about Zhaoduluo

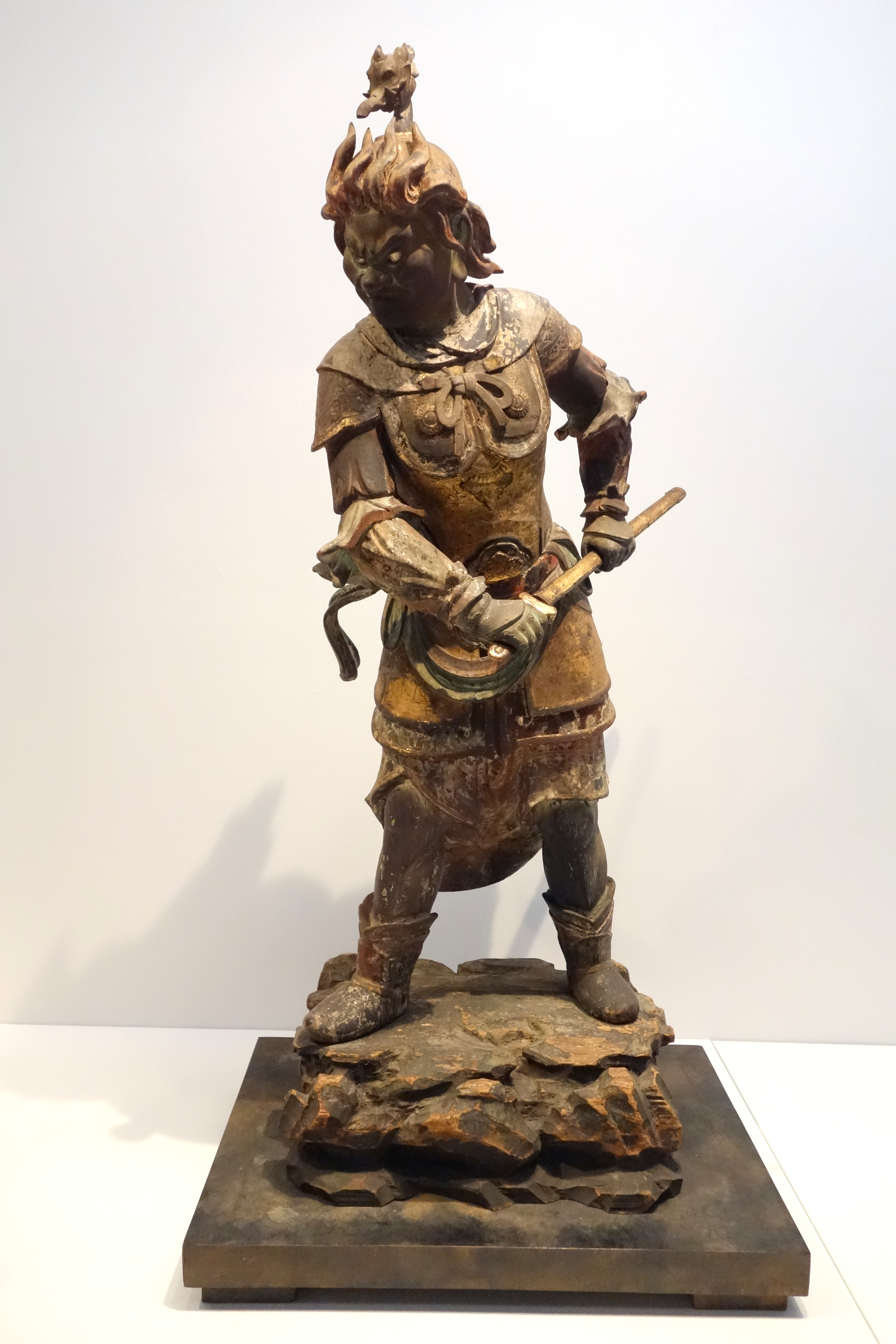
One of the Twelve Heavenly Generals at the Tokyo National Museum

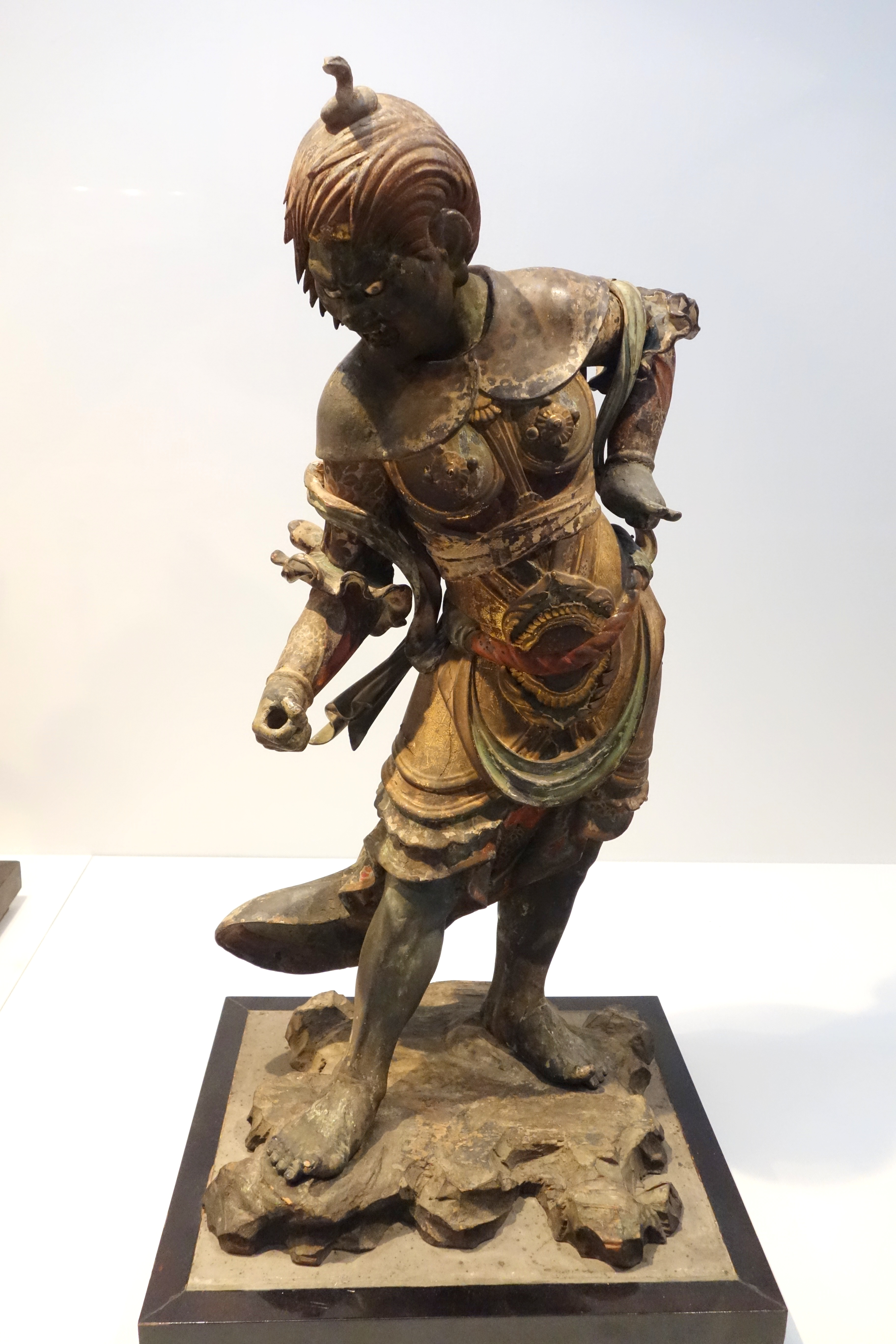
Another one of the Twelve Heavenly Generals

While the Honji and zodiac correspondences listed above are the standard in Japanese sources, there is variation among texts and regional traditions.
