= Sanjūsangen-dō =

Buddhist temple in Kyoto, Japan

Coordinates: 34°59′16″N 135°46′18″E

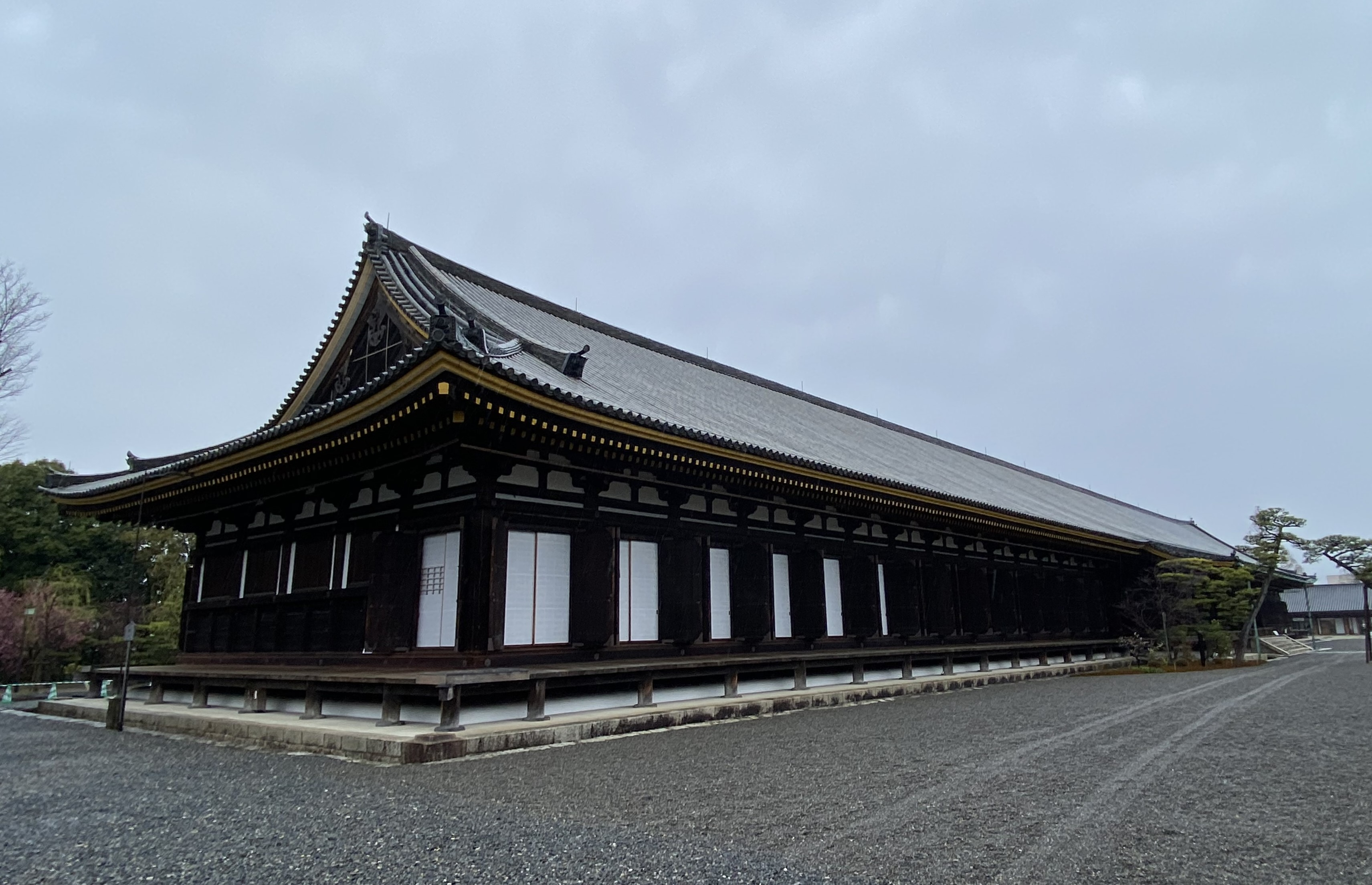
- Sanjusangen-dō in 2022

Religion
- Affiliation: Tendai
- Deity: Thousand Armed Kannon (Sahasrabhuja-arya-avalokiteśvara)

Location
- Location: 605-0941, Sanjusangendomawari, Higashiyama-ku, Kyoto, Kyoto Prefecture 675
- Country: Japan
- Interactive map of Sanjūsangen-dō

Architecture
- Founder: Taira no Kiyomori
- Completed: 1164

Sanjūsangen-dō (三十三間堂; Temple of thirty-three bays) is a Buddhist temple of the Tendai sect in the Higashiyama district of Kyoto, Japan.

The temple was founded in 1164 by Taira no Kiyomori for the cloistered Emperor Go-Shirakawa. It is officially known as Rengeō-in (蓮華王院; hall of the Lotus King) and belongs to the Myōhō-in temple complex.

Sanjūsangen-dō is most famous for its massively long hondō (main hall) dating from 1266 (Kamakura period) and designated a National Treasure of Japan, and the collection of sculptures it houses, including 1001 standing Thousand-armed Kannon, 28 standing attendants, a statue of Fūjin and a statue of Raijin, and the principal image of the temple, a big seated statue of Thousand-armed Kannon, all of them designated National Treasures in the category of sculptures, most of them dating to the Heian to Kamakura periods.

== History ==
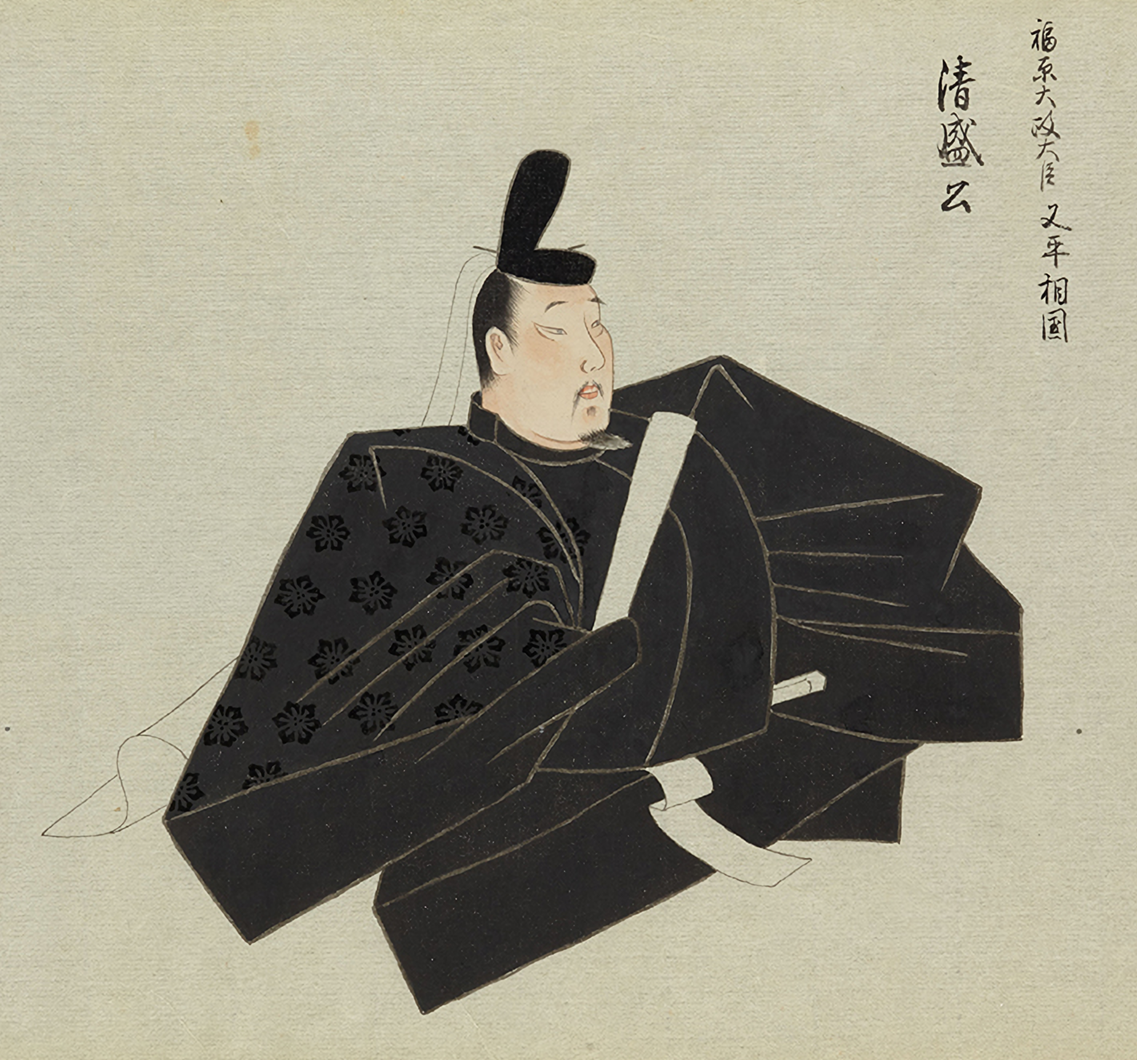
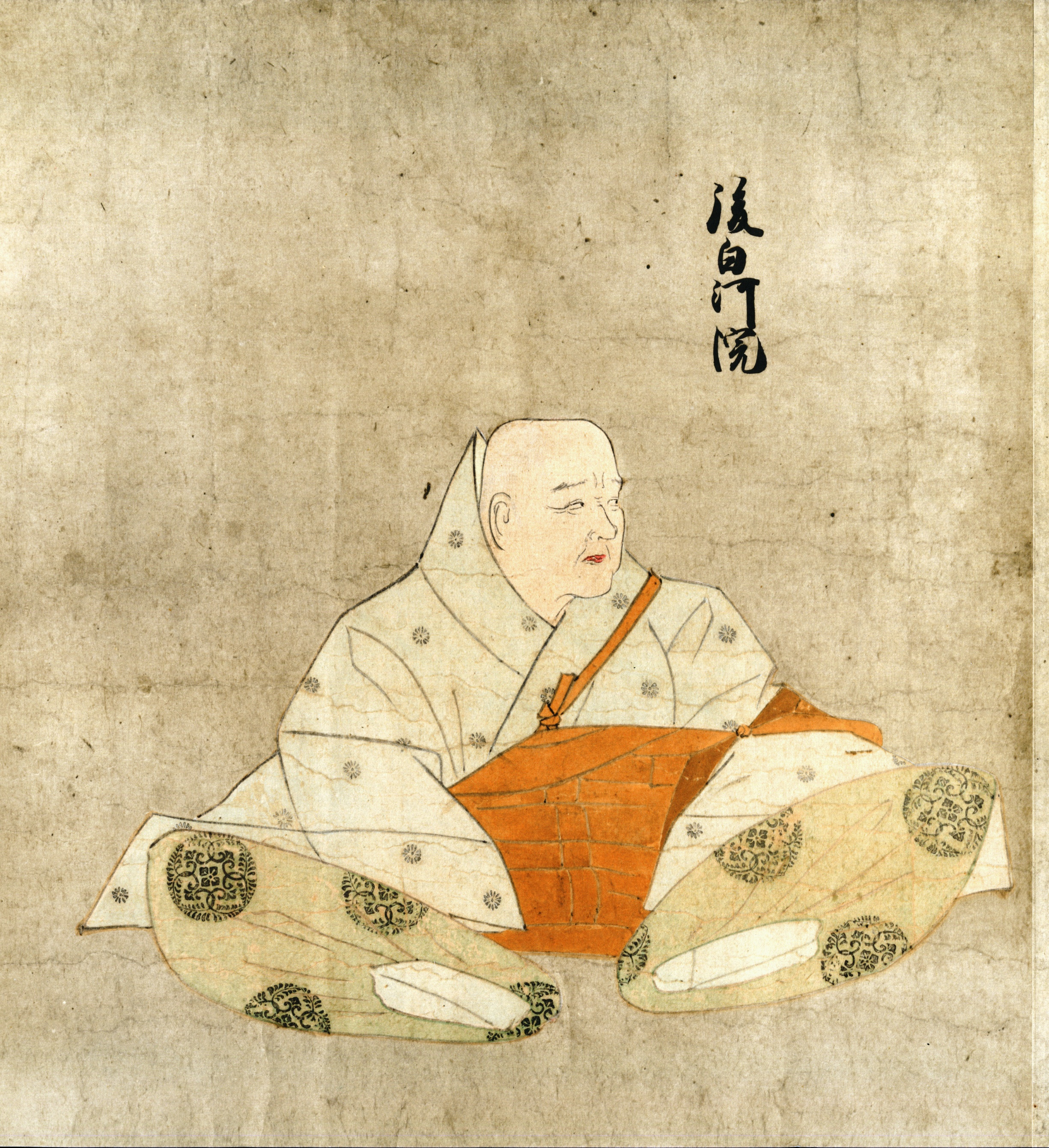
Taira no Kiyomori and Emperor Go-Shirakawa

Sanjūsangen-dō was founded by the famous samurai and politician Taira no Kiyomori (1118-1181) in 1164 for the cloistered Emperor Go-Shirakawa. He built the temple in the emperor's own compound Hōjūjidono in order to gain a noble title, that of Chancellor of the Realm, becoming the first samurai to do so. Go-Shirakawa's compound was around 1100 square meters in size, divided into Minamidono (the southern estate) and Kitadono (the northern estate). When Go-Shirakawa died in 1192, he was buried in the temple's east Hokkedō (hall of the Lotus Sutra).

The temple complex originally included several buildings other than the hondō (main hall), including a gojūnotō (five-storied pagoda), a Kannondō (a hall of Kannon) and a Fudodō (a hall of the Four Heavenly Kings). All of these buildings were completely destroyed in 1249 by a fire that broke out in the city. The Emperor Go-Saga (1220–1272) ordered the reconstruction of the hondō, which began in 1251. The building was completed in 1266 and survives to the present day. From the original 1000 standing Thousand-armed Kannon dating from the temple's construction in the late Heian period, only 124 were saved from the fire. The Emperor also ordered 876 new Kannon statues to replace the lost ones. These were created by three groups of Buddhist sculptors, Kei school (Keiha), En school (Enpa) and In school (Inpa), during the course of 16 years.

A popular kyūjutsu (archery) tournament known as Tōshiya ("passing arrow") was held at the west veranda of the temple for 255 years during the Edo period. The contest originated in the late 16th century dating back to 1606 when a samurai named Asaoka Heibei is said to have shot 51 arrows in rapid succession down the length of the veranda. In the beginning, archers shot arrows from the southern end of the veranda to the northern end where a curtain-like ornament was erected as a target. The contest gained popularity during the Edo period and by the late 17th century competitions between participants from the Owari and Kishū provinces were drawing big crowds.

The duel between the famous warrior Miyamoto Musashi and Yoshioka Denshichirō, leader of the Yoshioka-ryū, is popularly believed to have been fought just outside Sanjūsangen-dō in 1604.

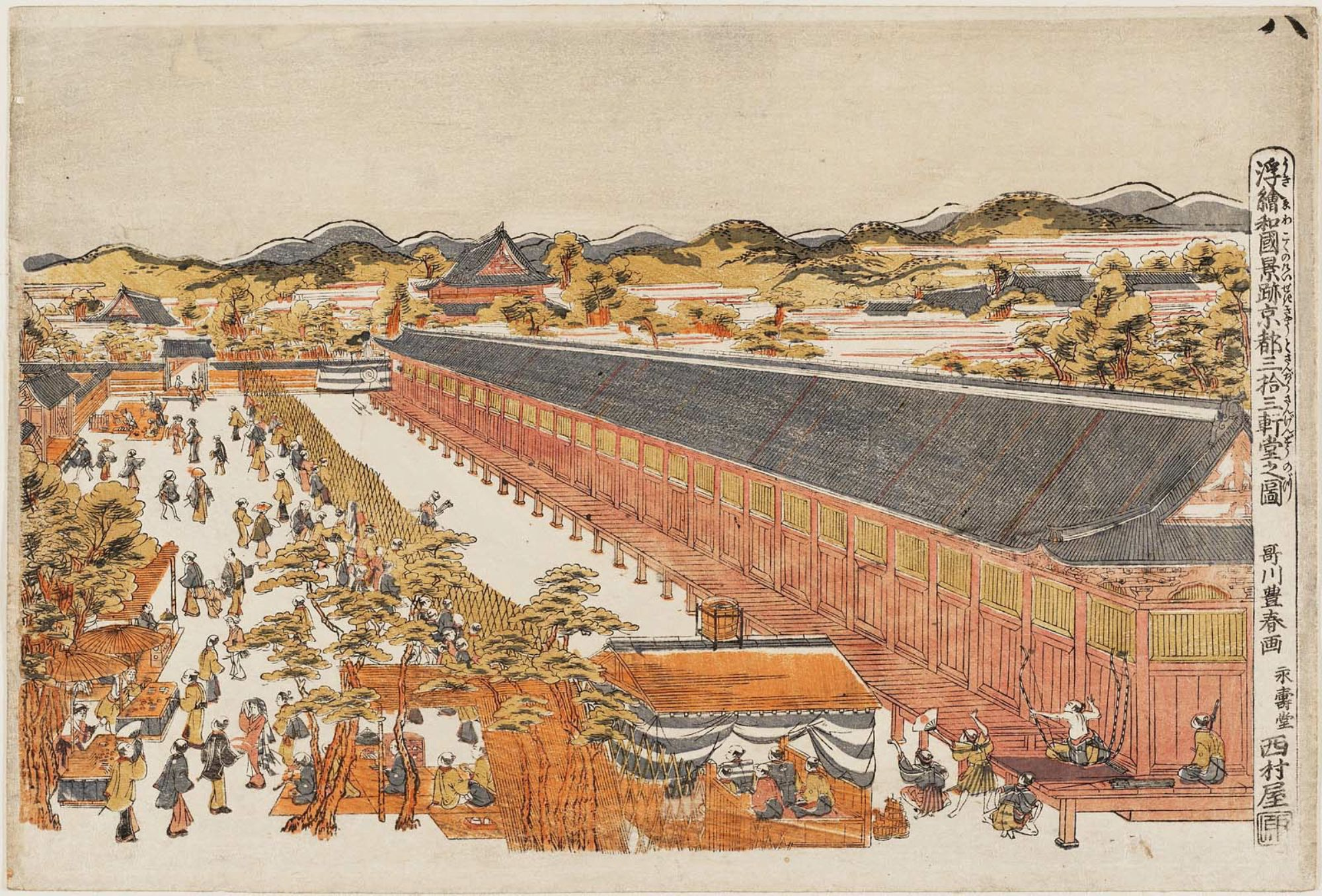
Painting of Sanjūsangen-dō by Utagawa Toyoharu, c. 1772–1781.

In the second Sunday of January, the temple has an event known as the Rite of the Willow, where worshippers are touched on the head with a sacred willow branch to cure and prevent headaches, and a modern version of the Tōshiya, the Festival of the Great Target, is held on the west veranda, drawing roughly 2,000 participants from throughout Japan. Archers shoot arrows into targets approximately 50 - 100 centimeters in diameter and 60 meters (198 feet) away at the opposite end of the veranda. The festival was initially male-dominated, but in recent times it has shifted to being mainly women dressed in traditional kimonos, with the target being 120 meters (394 feet) away.

== Important features ==
The main deity of the temple is Sahasrabhuja-arya-avalokiteśvara or the Thousand Armed Kannon. The statue of the main deity was created by the Kamakura sculptor Tankei and is a National Treasure of Japan. The temple also contains one thousand life-size statues of the Thousand Armed Kannon which stand on both the right and left sides of the main statue in 10 rows and 50 columns. Of these, 124 statues are from the original temple, rescued from the fire of 1249, while the remaining 876 statues were constructed in the 13th century. The statues are made of Japanese cypress clad in gold leaf. The temple is 120 meters long. Around the 1000 Kannon statues stand 28 statues of guardian deities. There are also two famous statues of Fūjin and Raijin.

=== Guardian deities and Hinduism ===
The 28 guardian deities stand in front of the Buddhist Kannon have their origins in Sanskrit texts of Hinduism. These ideas came to Japan through China, and the presence of both Hindu and Buddhist deities at Sanjūsangen-dō temple in Kyoto suggest various theories of the origin and spread of the spiritual and cultural ideas from India to east Asia.

Life-size statues of these deities are housed at Sanjūsangen-dō where they guard the principal statue of the 11 feet tall seated Senju Kannon. The temple also features 1,000 standing statues of the Senju Kannon. The deities at Sanjūsangen-dō include Naraenkengo-ou, Misshaku-kongorikishi, Touhou-ten, Birurokusha-tennou, Birubakusha-tennou, Bishamonten, Daibon-tennou, Taishaku-ten, Daibenkudoku-ten, Mawara-ou, Jinmo-ten, Konpira-ou, Manzensha-ou, Hippakara-ou, Gobujyogo-ten, Konjikikujyaku-ou, Sanshitai-sho, Nandaryu-ou, Sakararyu-ou, Karura-ou, Kondai-ou, Mansen-ou, Magoraka-ou, Makeishura-ou, Kendabba-ou, Ashura-ou, Kinnara-ou and Basusennin. These deities trace their origins to Indian Dharmic mythology covering Hindu, Jain and Buddhist, and correspond to Varuna, Vishnu, Lakshmi, Brahma, Shiva, Garuda, Vayu, Narayana, Indra and others.

== Visitor Experience ==
Sanjūsangen-dō offers guided tours to visitors year-round. Visitors will get an in-depth look at the history of the temple as they explore its grand halls. Visitors can also come during the annual archery contest known as Tōshiya, which showcases traditional archery skills. Visitors can get to the temple by taking a train ride to Kyoto's station then after a short bus ride on buses 206 and 208, followed by a 20-minute walk they will be at the temple.

The temple is close to many other attractions, such as the Kyoto National Museum so visitors are encouraged to visit the other sights while at the temple. Cameras are not allowed inside the temple, but a photo book will be offered at the end of the guided tour that you can purchase.

== Gallery ==
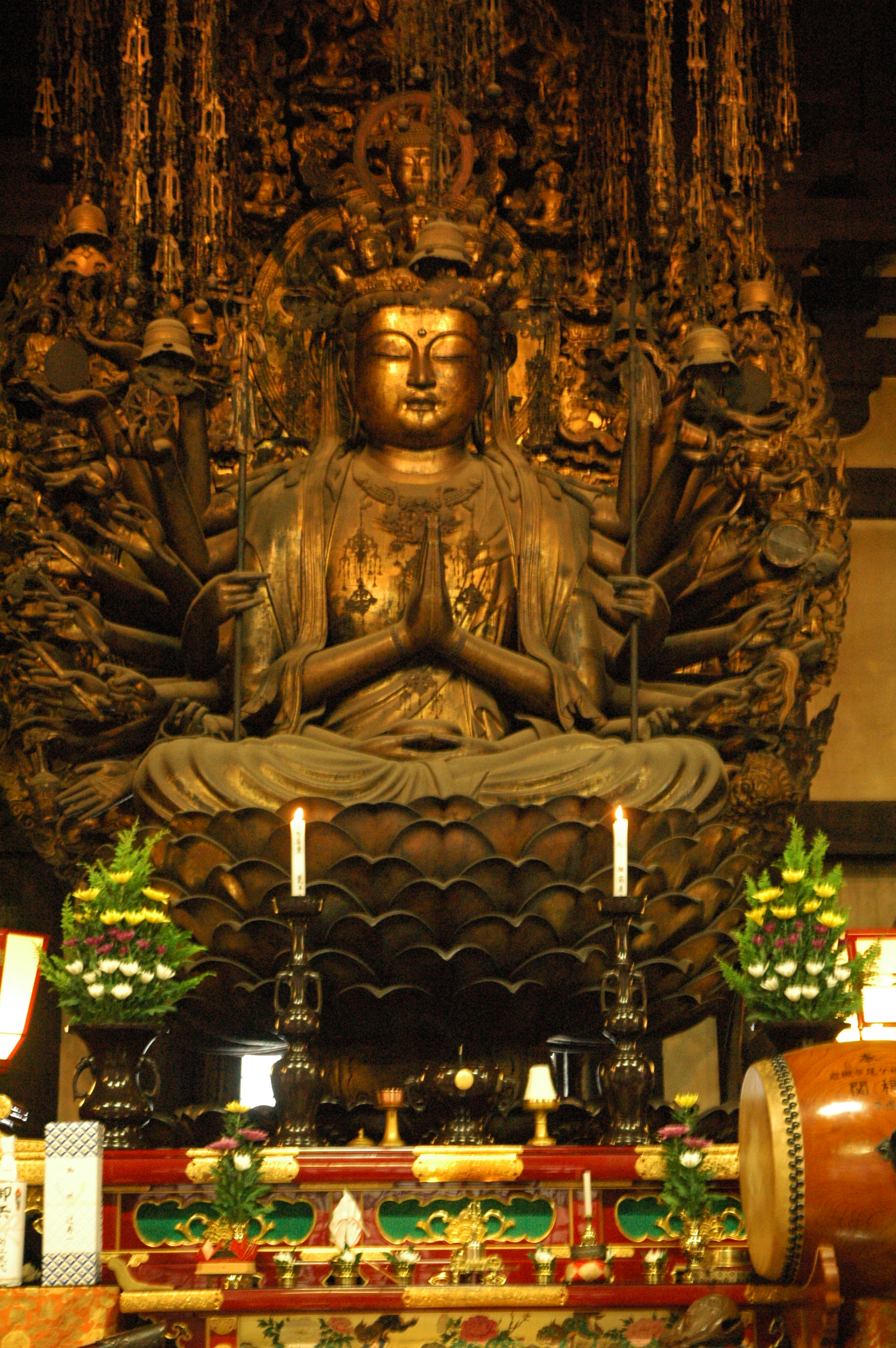
Senju Kannon, the main statue of veneration in Sanjusangen-dō (by Tankei)

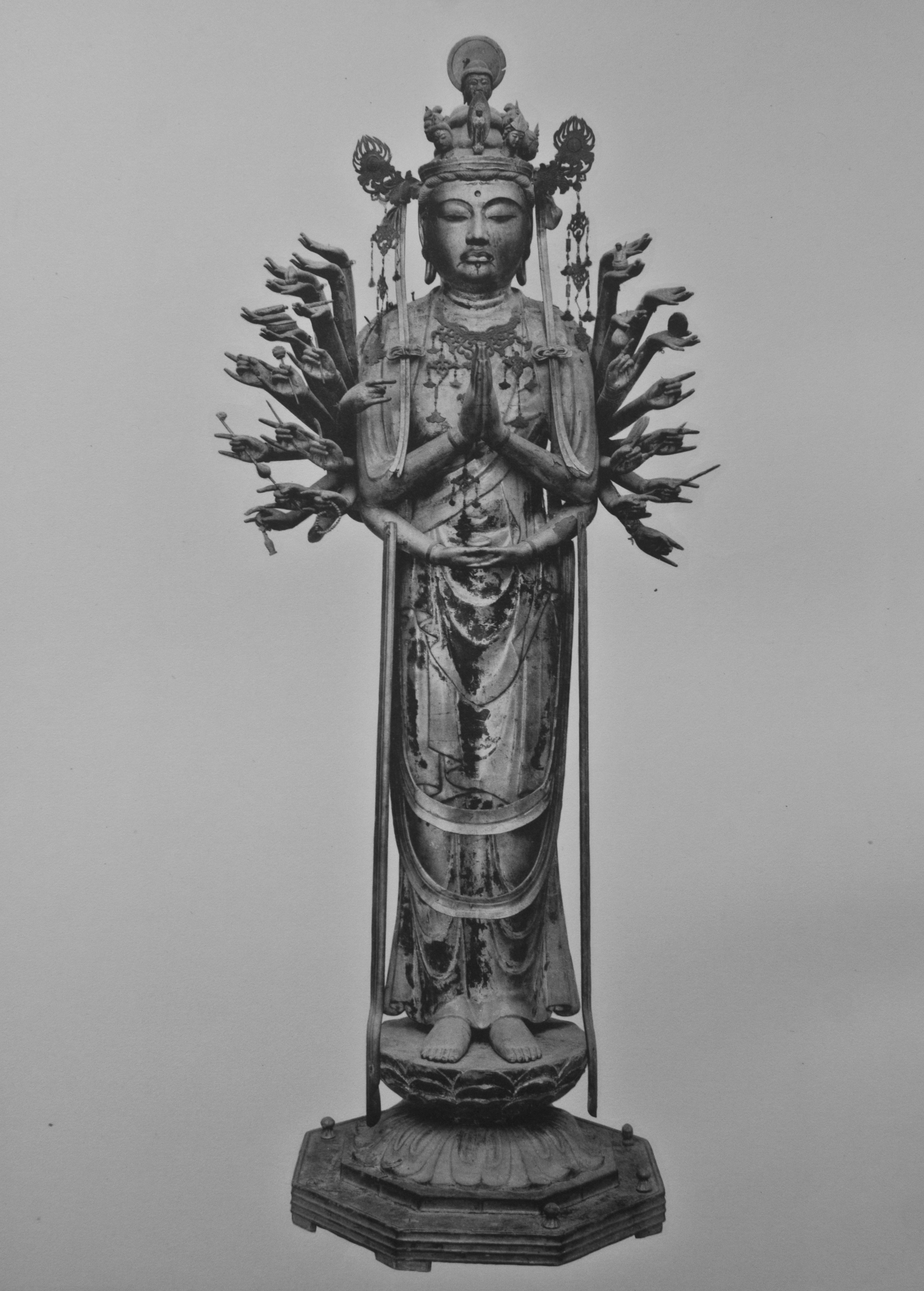
Senju Kannon No.20 (by Tankei)

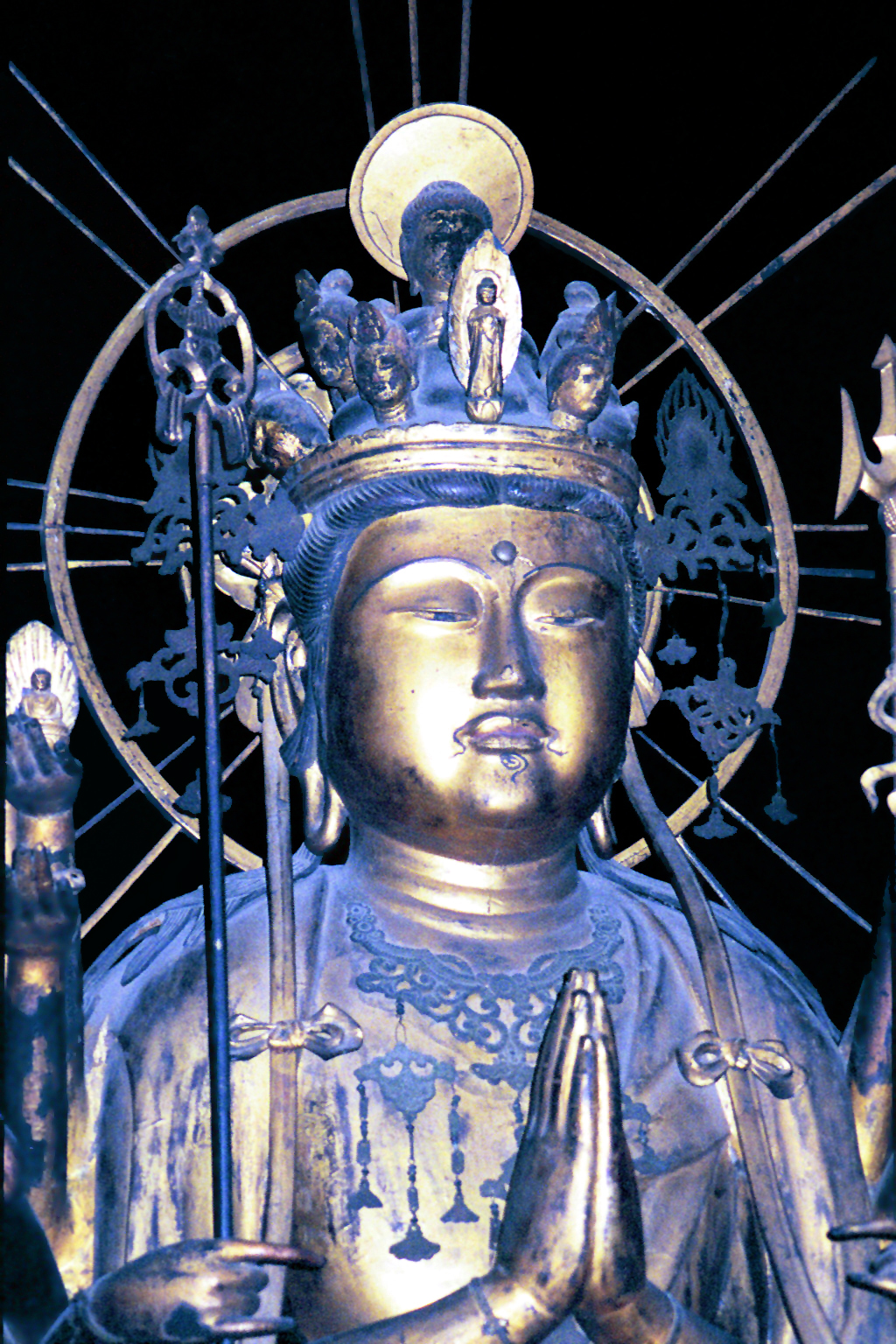
Senju Kannon No.40 (by Tankei)

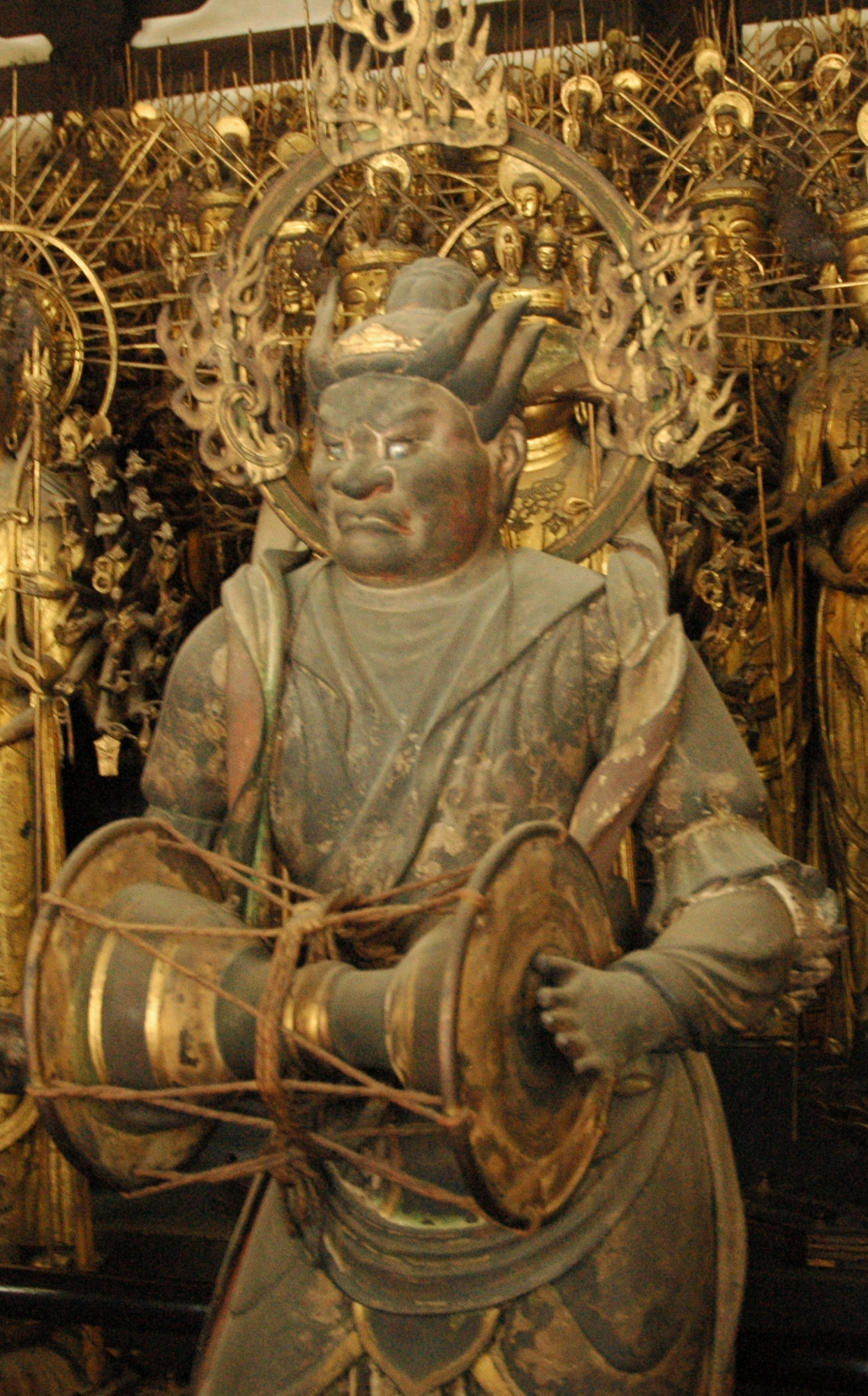
One of the 28 Sanjusangen-do temple deities, Kendatsuba (乾闥婆)

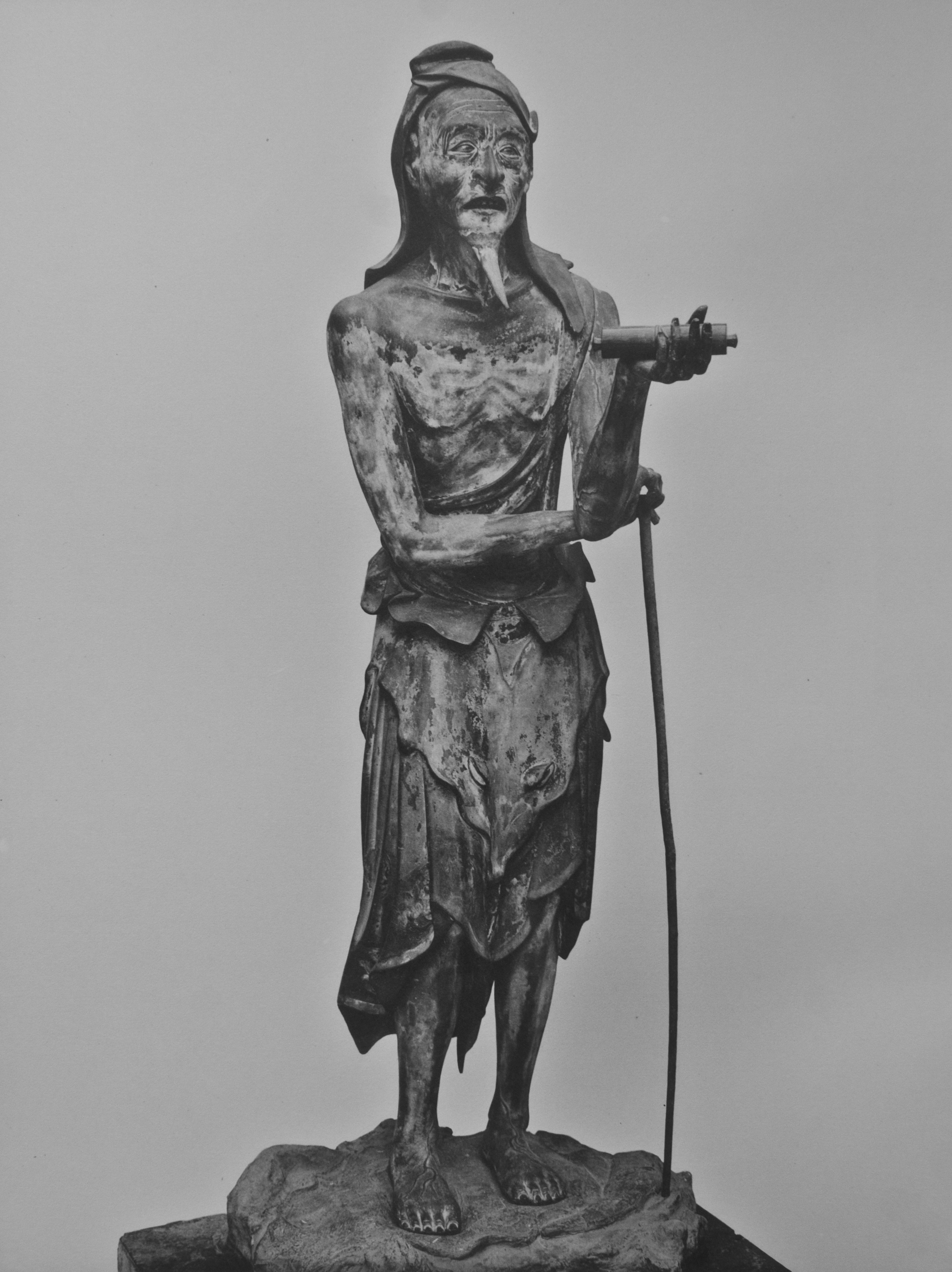
One of the 28 Sanjusangen-do temple deities, Basu Sennin (婆藪仙人)

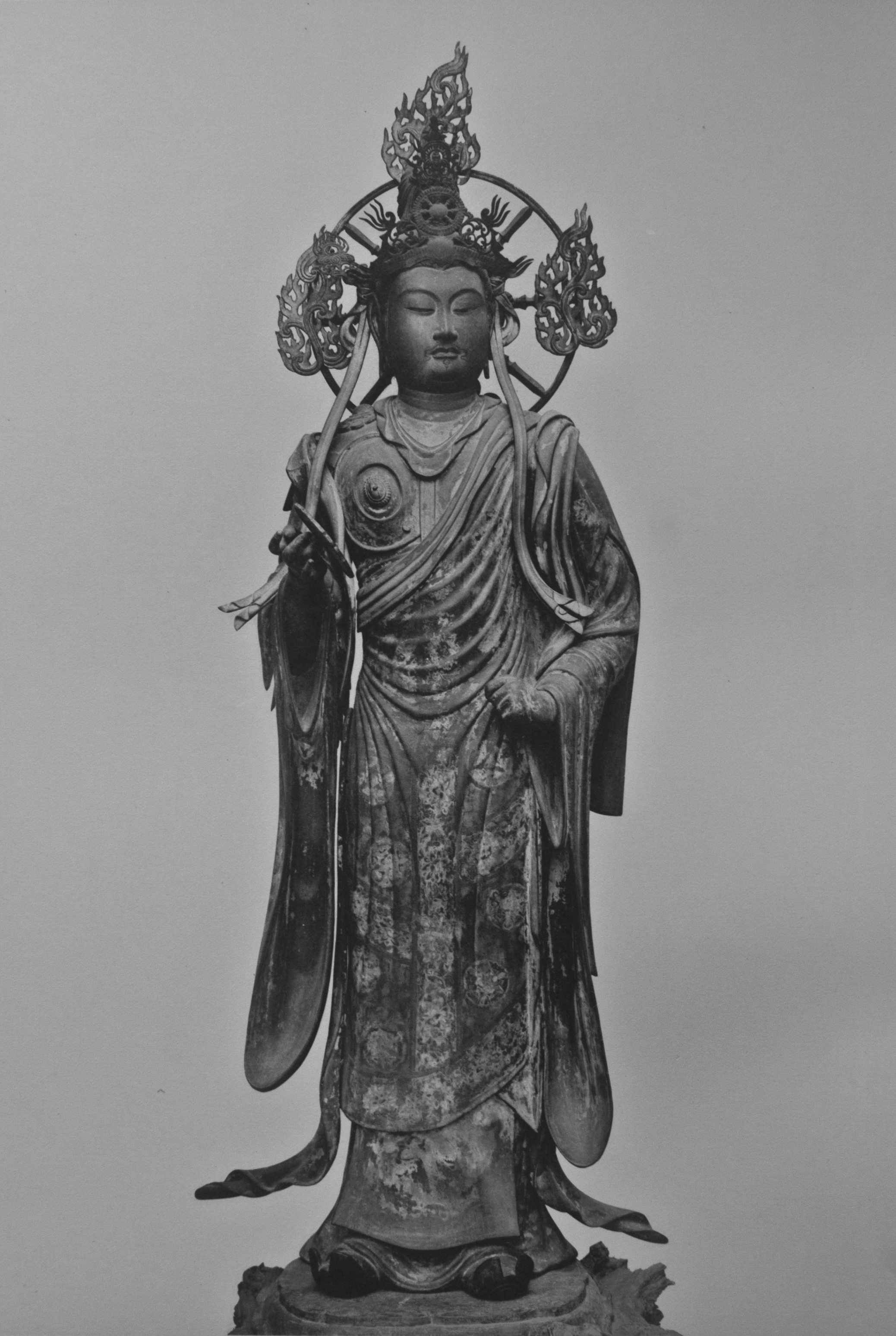
One of the 28 Sanjusangen-do temple deities, Taishakuten (帝釈天)

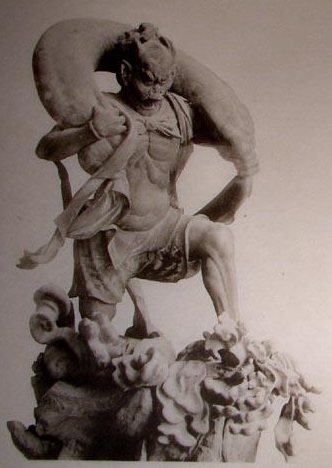
Fūjin, the Japanese kami of wind

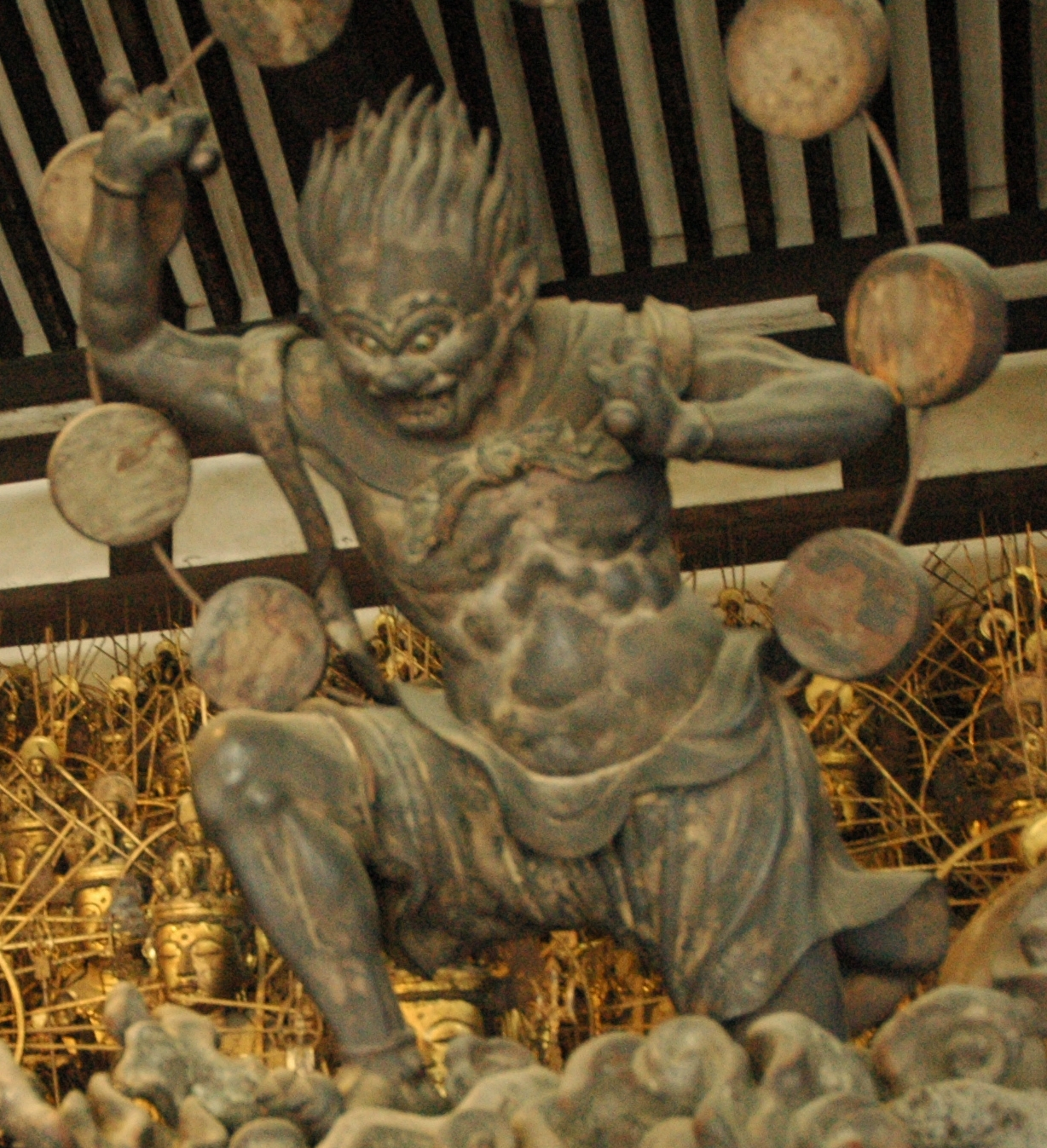
Raijin, the Japanese kami of thunder

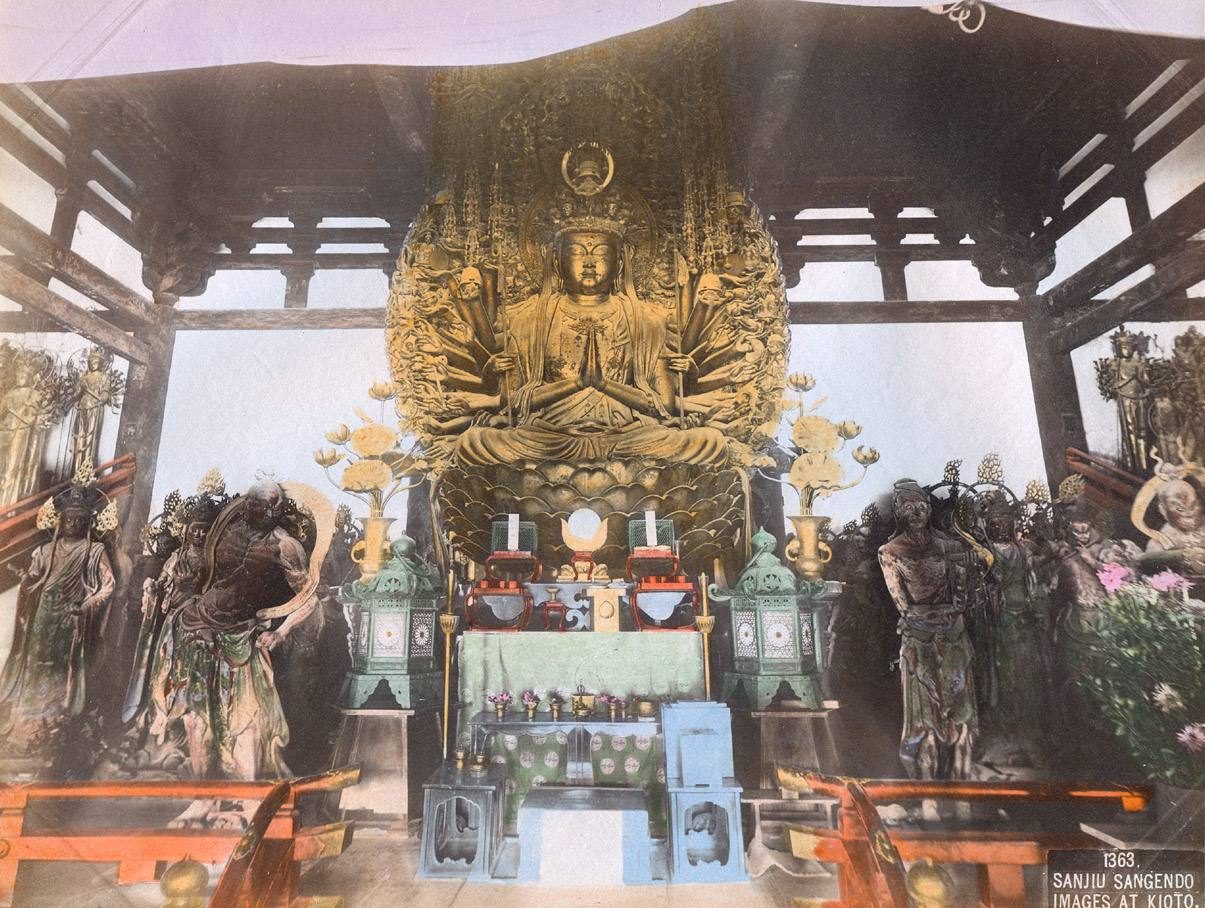
The arrangement of Buddha statues in the past. The 28 attendants that once surrounded the central principal image are now relocated to the front of the 1000 statues of Senju Kannon.

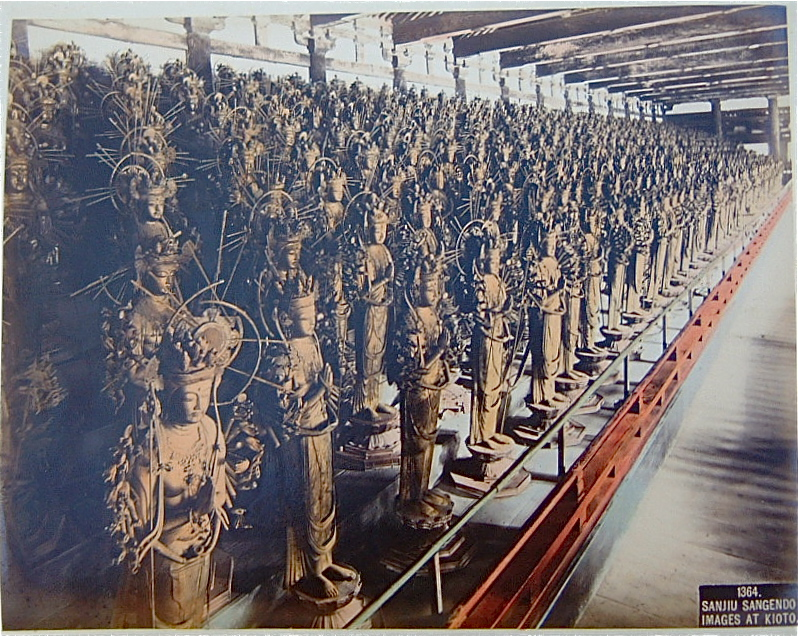
The arrangement of Buddha statues in the past.
