= Tankei =

Japanese sculptor

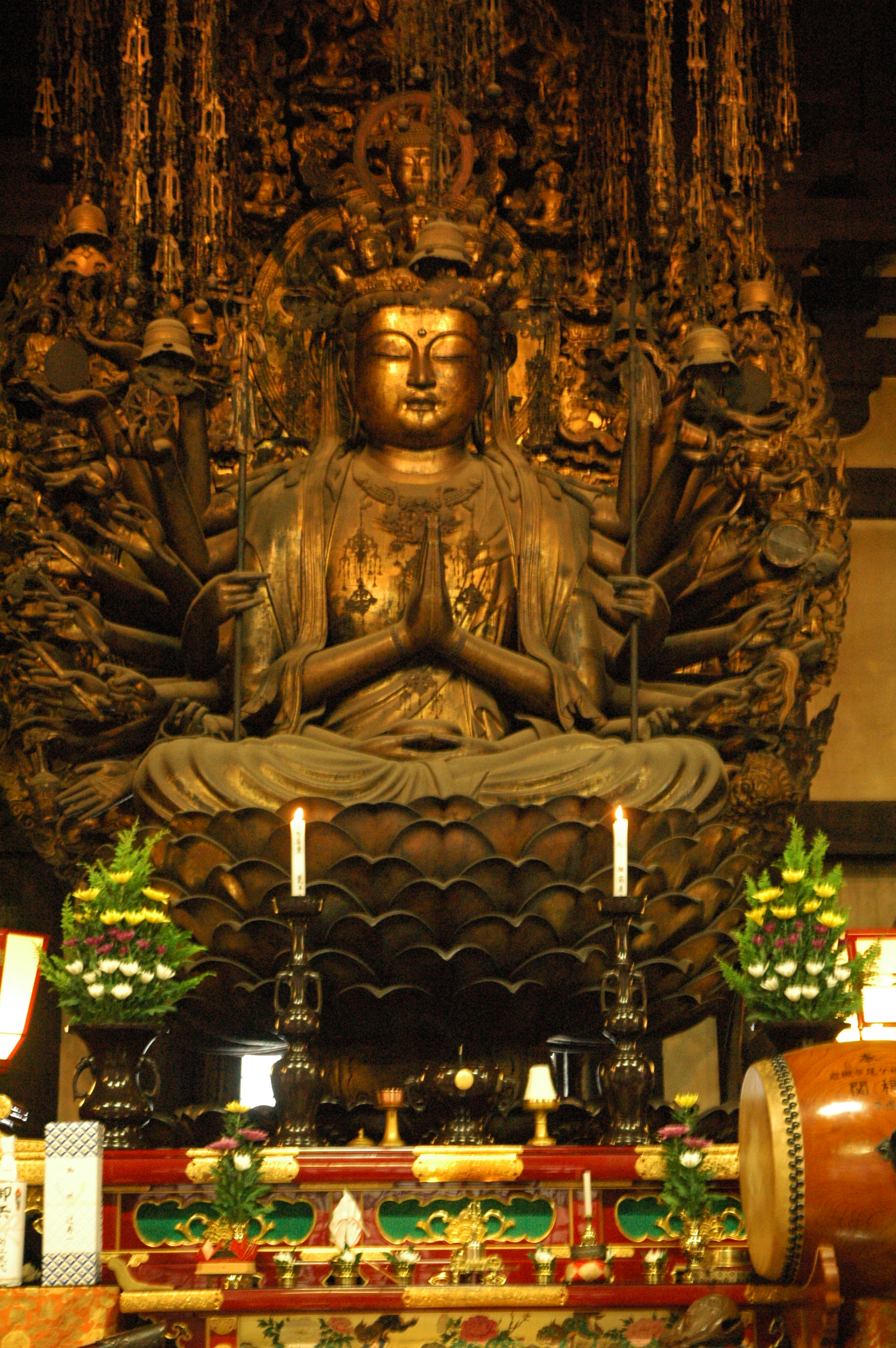
Statue of Sahasrabhuja-arya-avalokiteśvara in Sanjusangen-dō (National Treasure of Japan)

Tankei (湛慶 1173 – June 13, 1256) was a Japanese sculptor of the Kei school, which flourished in the Kamakura period. He was the student of and eldest son of the master sculptor Unkei. He was also the teacher, and uncle of the sculptor Kōen, who would collaborate with his works, and would succeed him as head of the Kei School upon his death in 1256.

== Famous works ==
- Statue of Sahasrabhuja-arya-avalokiteśvara in the temple known as Sanjusangen-dō in Kyoto.
- The statue of Ugyō, one of the Niō guardians at the Nandaimon in front of the temple Tōdai-ji in Nara, with Jōkaku and 12 assistant sculptors.

== Literature ==
- Hiromichi Soejima, « Japan, §V: Sculpture > (iv) Kamakura period (1185–1333) » [archive], Oxford Art Online, université d’Oxford. Consulté le 3 août 2012
- Hisashi Mōri, Sculpture of the Kamakura period, vol. 11, Weatherhill, coll. « Heibonsha Survey of Japanese Art », 1974 (ISBN 9780834810174), p. 70
- Victor Harris et Ken Matsushima, Kamakura: the renaissance of Japanese sculpture 1185–1333, British Museum Press, 2010 (ISBN 9780714114514), p. 36-37
