= Jōchō =

Japanese sculptor (died 1057)

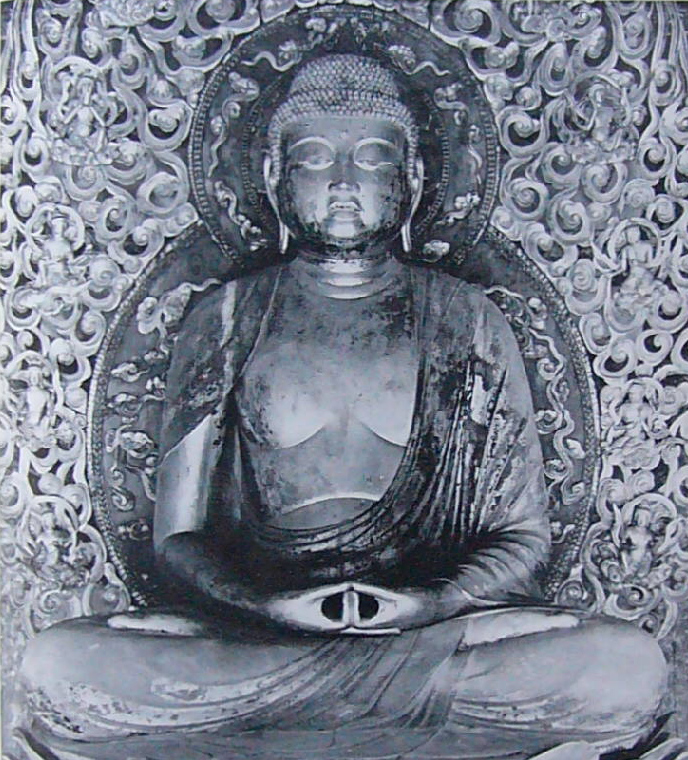
Amitābha in Byōdō-in created by Jōchō. 1053.

Jōchō (定朝; died 1057 AD), also known as Jōchō Busshi, was a Japanese sculptor of the Heian period. He popularized the yosegi technique of sculpting a single figure out of many pieces of wood, and he redefined the canon of body proportions used to create Buddhist imagery. His style spread across Japan and defined Japanese sculpture for the next 150 years. Today, art historians cite Jōchō as "the first of a new kind of master sculptor" and "one of the most innovative artists Japan has ever produced."

== Career ==
Jōchō trained at the Kōfuku-ji, a temple in Nara. By 1020, he was an artist of some renown with a studio in Kyoto. At this time, Fujiwara no Michinaga, the greatest of the Fujiwara regents of the Heian period, commissioned him to decorate the Hōjōji, a temple that Fujiwara had founded. Jōchō's efforts there earned him the title Hokkyō (Master of the Dharma Bridge) in 1022, a rare accolade for a sculptor.

Jōchō later worked on sculpture for the Kōfuku-ji. This work earned him an even higher title, Hōgen (Master of the Dharma Eye). He or his school may also have sculpted nine wooden Amida figures at Jōruri-ji, a temple at Tomino-o.

Michinaga's son, Fujiwara no Yorimichi, gave Jōchō his next commission. The artist was to create an Amida statue for the Phoenix Hall of the Byōdō-in, a temple in Uji near Kyoto. Jōchō completed the piece sometime after 1052. This is the earliest of Jōchō's works to have survived to the present day, and many other pieces by him are still preserved at this temple.

Jōchō and his studio are the first verifiable example of a school of Japanese art being perpetuated through Japan's guild-like inheritance system. Jōchō's techniques were passed on to his son, Kakujo, his grandsons, Injo and Raijo, his great-grandson, Kōjo, and ultimately Kōkei. The school started by this last artist would go on to revolutionize Japanese sculpture in the Kamakura period.

== Style ==
Jōchō popularized the technique of creating a work from several smaller pieces of sculpted wood (yosegi). Although it limited the amount of surface detail the artist could carve into each piece, the method forced the sculptor to convey his intended message within these limits. This resulted in more refined and ethereal-looking pieces. More importantly, it allowed several assistants to work on the sculpture at once, greatly speeding the process. Jōchō, as the master, did the finishing work. The technique also led to systematized proportions of body parts and simple surface details, as these sped the creation of the constituent parts and the formation of the finished piece.

Art historians often cite this new canon of body proportions as evidence of Jōchō's genius. He based the measurements on a unit equal to the distance between the sculpted figure's chin and hairline. The distance between each knee (in the seated lotus pose) is equal to the distance from the bottoms of the legs to the hair. The widely spaced and level knees thus form the base of a triangular design, conveying a feeling of stability and peace. The effect is further accentuated by the contrast of other elements in the design, particularly the figures' halos. These are intricately detailed, featuring dancing tennin, clouds, and flames. Jōchō's sculptures' expressions convey compassion and elegance, and the detailed and precise carving of the facial features projects a certain kindness.

The workshop method of dividing work among several craftsmen caught on, as did Jōchō's style. His school was imitated by sculptors across Japan for the over next 150 years, as Japanese sculpture degraded into a conformist orthodoxy before being reinvented in the Kamakura period.
