= Kōkei (sculptor) =

Japanese sculptor

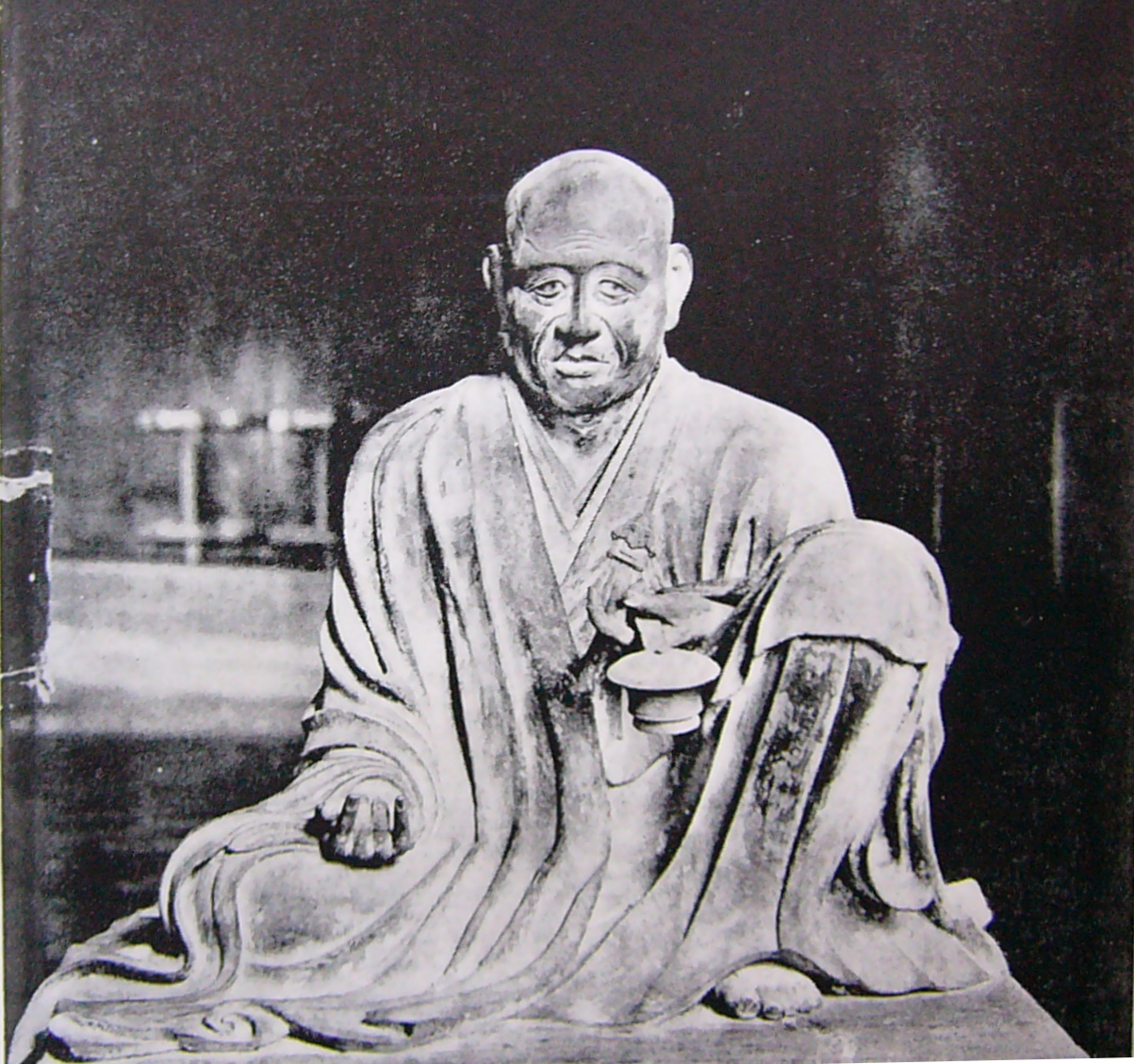
Six Patriarchs of the Hossō: Gyōga by Kōkei, Kōfuku-ji, 1189

Kōkei (康慶, active 1175–1200) was a Japanese sculptor of the Kamakura period. He headed the Kei school during the reconstructions of Tōdai-ji and Kōfuku-ji. Although his works are still largely in the style established by Jōchō in the Heian period, Kōkei's sculpture show a move toward the greater realism that characterizes the works of his disciples Unkei, Kaikei, and Jōkei.

== Career ==
Kōkei was a direct descendant, both genetically and artistically, of Jōchō, a master sculptor of the Heian period. He was likely the organizer of the Kei school, which comprised his son, disciples, and assistants. Notable members of Kōkei's school include Unkei, Kaikei, and Jōkei.

Today, Kōkei is best known for leading teams involved in the 1188–1189 reconstruction of the Tōdai-ji and Kōfuku-ji, temples in Nara, Japan. He and his assistants were placed in charge of work at the Nanendō (Southern Octagonal Hall). Statues by Kōkei there include the Four Heavenly Guardians and the Six Patriarchs of Hossō. The centerpiece is the giant Fukūkenjaku Kannon, which he created in 1188. This was a replacement for an original created in 746 and lost in a temple fire.

First-hand details of Kōkei's talent and personality come from the diary of Kujō Kanezane, who became the Fujiwara chieftain in 1186, and thus took over as supervisor of the temple reconstructions. Kanezane paints the artist as a greatly talented and morally sound man, but also as someone who did not refrain from questioning Kanezane's decisions.

== Style ==
Kōkei's works are still largely in the Heian mold established by his ancestor, Jōchō. For example, Kōkei's Fukūkenjaku Kannon follows Jōchō's canon of proportions: widely spread legs provide a base for a triangular figure with a square-shaped face. Likewise, the folds of drapery still follow a conventional geometric pattern.

However, Kōkei does show signs of the emerging realism that characterizes the art of the Kei school. He uses crystal inlays to give a more lifelike sheen to the Kannon's eyes and byakugo (Sanskrit: urna). The details of the face and clothing are more deeply carved and realized than those in Jōchō's work. Individual hairs are carefully carved into the figure's head. The result is a figure that seems more corporeal than the ephemeral-looking works of the previous 150 years.
