= List of national treasures of Japan (sculptures) =

National treasures of Japan, sculptures

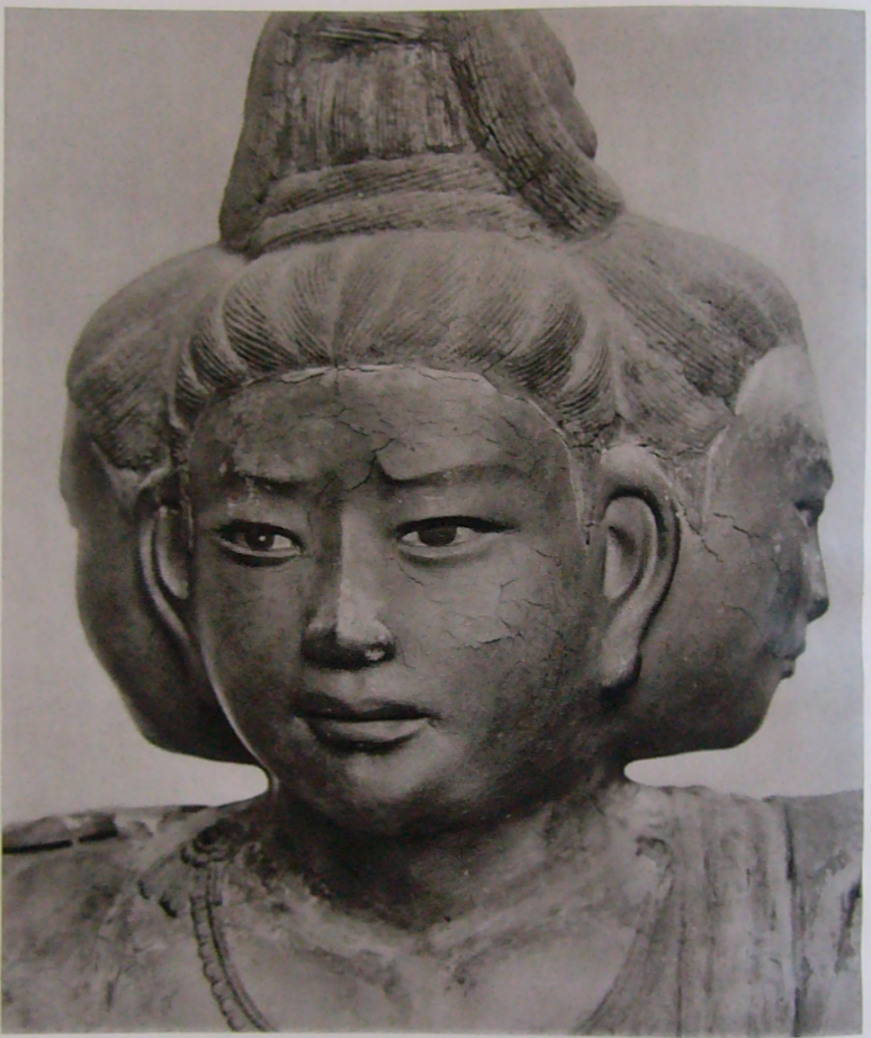
Ashura, a Japanese national treasure sculpture from 734

In the mid-6th century, the introduction of Buddhism from the Koreanic state Baekje to Japan resulted in a revival of Japanese sculpture. Buddhist monks, artisans and scholars settled around the capital in Yamato Province (present day Nara Prefecture) and passed their techniques to native craftsmen. Consequently, early Japanese sculptures from the Asuka and Hakuhō periods show strong influences of continental art, which initially were characterized by almond-shaped eyes, upward-turned crescent-shaped lips and symmetrically arranged folds in the clothing. The workshop of the Japanese sculptor Tori Busshi, who was strongly influenced by the Northern Wei style, produced works which exemplify such characteristics. The Shakyamuni triad and the Guze Kannon at Hōryū-ji are prime examples. By the late 7th century, wood replaced bronze and copper. By the early Tang dynasty, greater realism was expressed by fuller forms, long narrow slit eyes, softer facial features, flowing garments and embellishments with ornaments such as bracelets and jewels. Two prominent examples of sculptures of this period are the Shō Kannon at Yakushi-ji and the Yumechigai Kannon at Hōryū-ji.

During the Nara period, from 710 to 794, the government established and supported workshops called zōbussho, the most prominent of which was located in the capital Nara at Tōdai-ji, which produced Buddhist statuary. Clay, lacquer and wood, in addition to bronze, were used. Stylistically, the sculptures were influenced by the high Tang style, showing fuller body modelling, more natural drapery and a greater sense of movement. Representative examples of Nara period sculpture include the Great Buddha and the Four Heavenly Kings at Tōdai-ji, or the Eight Legions at Kōfuku-ji.

Early Heian period works before the mid-10th century appear heavy compared to Nara period statues, carved from single blocks of wood, and characterised by draperies carved with alternating round and sharply cut folds. Stylistically, they followed high to later Tang style. In the Heian period the zōbussho were replaced with temple-run and independent workshops; wood became the primary medium; and a specific Japanese style emerged. By the mid-10th century, the style was refined presenting a more calm and gentle appearance, with attenuated proportions. Jōchō was the most important sculptor of this time, and he used the yosegi technique, in which several pieces of wood are joined to sculpt a single figure. He was the ancestor of three important schools of Japanese Buddhist statuary: the Enpa, Inpa and Keiha school. The Amida Nyorai at Byōdō-in is the only extant work by Jōchō. Japanese sculpture experienced a renaissance during the Kamakura period, led by the Kei school. Partially influenced by Song dynasty China, their sculpture is characterised by realism featuring elaborate top knots, jewelry, and wavy drapery. Although predominantly wooden, bronze was also used as a material for the statues. As a novelty, portrait sculptures of prominent monks were created adjacent to the depiction of Buddhist deities.

The term "national treasure" has been used in Japan to denote cultural properties since 1897. The definition and the criteria have changed since the inception of the term. These sculptures adhere to the current definition, and have been designated national treasures since the Law for the Protection of Cultural Properties came into force on June 9, 1951. The items are selected by the Ministry of Education, Culture, Sports, Science and Technology based on their "especially high historical or artistic value". This list presents 142 entries of sculptures, including those from Classical and early Feudal Japan of the 7th-century Asuka period to the 13th-century Kamakura period, although the number of sculptures is higher, because groups of related sculptures have sometimes been joined to form single entries. The sculptures listed depict Buddhist and Shintō deities or priests venerated as founders of temples. Also included in this category is a group of ancient masks. Some of the most ancient sculptures were imported directly from China.

== Statistics ==
Various materials have been used for the sculptures. Although most are wooden, 12 entries in the list are bronze, 11 are lacquer, 7 are made of clay and 1 entry, the Usuki Stone Buddhas, is a stone sculpture. Typically hinoki, Japanese nutmeg, sandalwood and camphorwood were the woods used for the wooden sculptures. Wooden sculptures were often lacquered or covered with gold-leaf. The smallest statue measures around 10 centimetres (3.9 in), whereas the Great Buddhas of Nara and Kamakura are about 13 metres (43 ft) and 15 metres (49 ft) high. The objects on the list are located in Buddhist temples, or in museums associated with temples. Some items are located in shrines, as well as in secular museums.

Nara Prefecture is home to the largest number of national treasure sculptures, with 77 of the 142 entries. Together with the 42 entries located in Kyoto Prefecture, they constitute the bulk of sculptural national treasures. Hōryū-ji and Kōfuku-ji are the locations with the most entries, with 18 and 18 designations respectively.

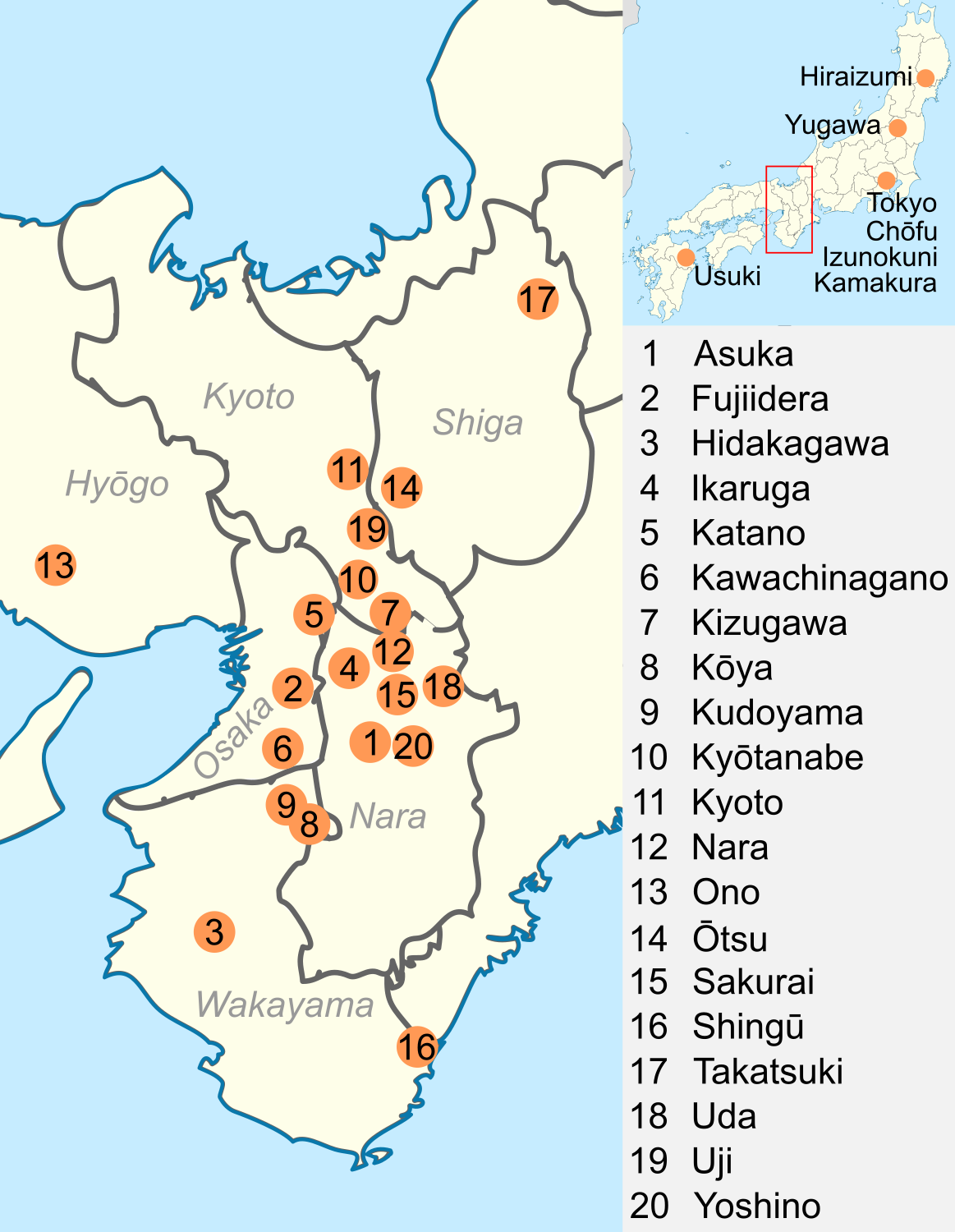
Map showing the location of sculptural national treasures in Japan

| Prefecture | City | National treasures |
|---|---|---|
| Fukushima | Yugawa | 1 |
| Hyōgo | Ono | 1 |
| Iwate | Hiraizumi | 1 |
| Kanagawa | Kamakura | 1 |
| Kyoto | Kizugawa | 3 |
| Kyoto | Kyōtanabe | 1 |
| Kyoto | Kyoto | 35 |
| Kyoto | Uji | 3 |
| Nara | Asuka | 1 |
| Nara | Ikaruga | 19 |
| Nara | Nara | 51 |
| Nara | Sakurai | 2 |
| Nara | Uda | 3 |
| Nara | Yoshino | 1 |
| Ōita | Usuki | 1 |
| Osaka | Fujiidera | 2 |
| Osaka | Katano | 1 |
| Osaka | Kawachinagano | 2 |
| Shiga | Ōtsu | 3 |
| Shiga | Takatsuki | 1 |
| Shizuoka | Izunokuni | 1 |
| Tokyo | Chōfu | 1 |
| Tokyo | Tokyo | 2 |
| Wakayama | Hidakagawa | 1 |
| Wakayama | Kōya | 2 |
| Wakayama | Kudoyama | 1 |
| Wakayama | Shingū | 1 |

| Period | National treasures |
|---|---|
| Asuka period | 17 (Note: The Usuki Stone Buddhas, the sculptures at Kongō-ji and the 1001 Kannon images at Sanjūsangen-dō date to the late Heian, early Kamakura period and are therefore counted double in this table. The canopies at the Kon-dō of Hōryū-ji date to the Asuka and Kamakura periods and are therefore counted double in this table. The Gigaku masks at the Tokyo National Museum date to the Asuka and Nara periods and are therefore counted double in this table.) |
| Tang dynasty | 3 |
| Nara period | 28 |
| Heian period | 67 |
| Northern Song | 1 |
| Kamakura period | 31 |

== Usage ==
The table's columns (except for Remarks and Pictures) are sortable pressing the arrows symbols. The following gives an overview of what is included in the table and how the sorting works.

- Name: name as registered in the List of National Treasures
- Remarks: placement of statues (as a group, separately,...) and artist (if known)
- Date: period and year; The column entries sort by year. If only a period is known, they sort by the start year of that period.
- Material and technique: wood/bronze/..., lacquered/colored/...; The column entries sort by the main material (stone/clay/wood/lacquer/bronze).
- Pose: standing/seated Amida Nyorai/Yakushi Nyorai/...; The column entries sort by the name of the principal image or as "set" in the case of sets of sculptures that don't fall under a common group name.
- Height: height in cm; The column entries sort by the largest height if an entry is a group of statues.
- Present location: "building-name temple/museum/shrine-name town-name prefecture-name"; The column entries sort as "prefecture-name town-name temple/museum/shrine-name building-name".
- Image: picture of the statue or a characteristic statue in a group of statues

== Treasures ==
| Name | Remarks | Date | Material | Pose | Height | Present location | Image |
|---|---|---|---|---|---|---|---|
| Statues and canopy inside the Golden Hall (Konjiki-dō) (金色堂堂内諸像及天蓋, konjiki-dō dōnai shozō oyobi tengai) | 32 statues in the three altars and another seated Amida Nyorai with fragments of a wooden halo-pedestal. The three canopies of the altars are part of the nomination. | Heian period, ca. 1124–1187 | Joined wood-block sculpture (Hinoki wood for the Amida, katsura for the Jizō and Nitennō); lacquer with gold leaf embossing | Three seated Amida Nyorai, three sets of Amida attendants (Kannon and Seishi), three sets of Nitennō, 18 Jizō Bosatsu | 50–78 cm (20–31 in) | Konjikidō (金色堂), Chūson-ji, Hiraizumi, Iwate | |
| Yakushi Nyorai and two attendants (木造薬師如来及両脇侍像, mokuzō yakushi nyorai oyobi ryōkyōjizō) | — | Heian period, c. 806–810 | Zelkova wood, gold leaf over lacquer (shippaku (漆箔)) | Seated Yakushi Nyorai (healing Buddha) flanked by standing Nikkō Bosatsu and Gakkō Bosatsu (Bodhisattvas of sun and moon light) | 141.8 cm (55.8 in) (Yakushi), 169.4 cm (66.7 in), 173.9 cm (68.5 in) | Shōjō-ji, Yugawa, Fukushima | |
| Fugen Bosatsu (Samantabhadra) on an elephant (木造普賢菩薩騎象像, mokuzō fugen bosatsu kizōzō) | — | Heian period, first half of 12th century | Colored wood and cut-gold foil (kirikane (截金)) on wood | Seated statue of Fugen Bosatsu on elephant | 140 cm (55 in) (whole sculpture), 55.2 cm (21.7 in) (statue) | Okura Museum of Art, Tokyo | Three-quarter view of a cross-legged seated deity on a pedestal with hands joined as in prayer in front of the body. |
| Wooden Gigaku masks (木造伎楽面, mokuzō gigakumen) and Dry lacquer Gigaku masks (乾漆伎楽面, kanshitsu gigakumen) | — | Asuka and Nara period | Wood (28 masks) and dry lacquer (乾漆, kanshitsu) (3 masks) | Gigaku masks handed down as treasures of Hōryū-ji, 19 made of camphor wood (second half of the 7th century), 9 made of kiri and 3 of dry lacquer (either from the first half of the 8th century). Japan's oldest masks. | 23.0–44.0 cm (9.1–17.3 in) (wood) and 26.3–28.5 cm (10.4–11.2 in) (dry lacquer) | Tokyo National Museum, Tokyo | |
| Shakyamuni (Shaka Nyorai) (銅造釈迦如来倚像, dōzō shaka nyoraizō) | Also known as Hakuhō Buddha | Asuka period, ca. 700 | Gilded bronze | Seated Shakyamuni (Shaka Nyorai) | 60.6 cm (23.9 in) | Jindai-ji, Chōfu, Tokyo | |
| Great Buddha (銅造阿弥陀如来坐像, dōzō amida nyoraizō) | Outdoor statue cast by Hisatomo Tanji and Ōno Gorōemon. The second largest statue in the list. | Kamakura period, 1252 | Bronze cast, gold leaf over lacquer (shippaku (漆箔)) | Seated Amida Nyorai | 13.35 m (43.8 ft), 93 t (92 long tons; 103 short tons) | Kōtoku-in, Kamakura, Kanagawa | Front view of an outside cross-legged seated statue. The eyes are closed and the hands rest on the lap with palms facing upward. The statue is left-right symmetric, appears green of copper rust and is placed on a stone platform. |
| Amida Nyorai (木造阿弥陀如来坐像, mokuzō amida nyorai zazō), Fudō Myōō and two attendants (木造不動明王二童子立像, mokuzō fudō myōō oyobi ni dōji ritsuzō), Bishamonten (木造毘沙門天立像, mokuzō bishamonten ritsuzō) | By Unkei | Kamakura period, 1186 | Colored wood | Seated Amida Nyorai, Standing Bishamonten, Fudō Myōō and two attendants | — | Ganjōju-in, Izunokuni, Shizuoka | |
| Eleven-faced Goddess of Mercy (木造十一面観音立像, mokuzō jūichimenkannon ryūzō) | — | Heian period, mid-9th century | Colored wood | Standing Jūichimen Kannon | 177.3 cm (69.8 in) | Kōgen-ji (向源寺) (Dōgan-ji Kannondō (渡岸寺観音堂)}), Takatsuki, Shiga | |
| Shinra Myōjin (木造新羅明神坐像, mokuzō shinra myōjin zazō) | Statue of Mii-dera's guardian deity | Heian period, 11th century | Colored wood and cut-gold foil (kirikane (截金)) on wood | Seated Shinra Myōjin (新羅明神) | 78 cm (31 in) | Shinra Zenshin Hall (新羅善神堂, shinra zenshindō), Mii-dera, Ōtsu | |
| Chishō Daishi (Enchin) (木造智証大師坐像, mokuzō chishō daishi zazō) or Okotsu Daishi (御骨大師) | — | Heian period, 9th century | Colored wood | Seated Chishō Daishi (Enchin) | 86.3 cm (34.0 in) | Tō-in Daishi Hall (唐院大師堂, tōin daishidō), Mii-dera, Ōtsu | — |
| Chishō Daishi (Enchin) (木造智証大師坐像, mokuzō chishō daishi zazō) or Chūson Daishi (中尊大師) | — | Heian period, 10th century | Colored wood | Seated Chishō Daishi (Enchin) | 84.3 cm (33.2 in) | Tō-in Daishi Hall (唐院大師堂, tōin daishidō), Mii-dera, Ōtsu | |
| Shakyamuni (Shaka Nyorai) (銅造釈迦如来坐像, dōzō shaka nyorai zazō) | — | Asuka period, beginning of 8th century | Gilt bronze | Seated Shakyamuni (Shaka Nyorai) | 240.3 cm (94.6 in) | Hon-dō, Kaniman-ji (蟹満寺), Kizugawa, Kyoto | |
| Eleven-faced Goddess of Mercy (木心乾漆十一面観音立像, mokushin kanshitsu jūichimenkannon ryūzō) | — | Nara period, second half of 8th century | Wood-core dry lacquer (木心乾漆 (mokushin kanshitsu)), gold leaf over lacquer (shippaku (漆箔)) | Standing Jūichimen Kannon | 172.7 cm (68.0 in) | Hon-dō, Kannon-ji (観音寺), Kyōtanabe, Kyoto | |
| Five Tathagatas (木造五智如来坐像, mokuzō gochi nyorai zazō) | Important sculpture of early Esoteric Buddhism. Formerly enshrined in a mountain top butsu-dō | Heian period (between 851 and 859) | Wood | Five seated Five Wisdom Tathāgatas | 158.6 cm (62.4 in) (Vairocana), 109.5 cm (43.1 in) (Akshobhya, 109.7 cm (43.2 in) (Ratnasambhava, 109.2 cm (43.0 in) (Amitābha), 106.6 cm (42.0 in) (Amoghasiddhi) | Anshō-ji (安祥寺), Kyoto | |
| Thousand-armed Kannon (木造千手観音立像, mokuzō senjū kannon ryūzō) | — | Heian period (876 images)–Kamakura period (124 images), Muromachi Period (1 image) | Wood, gold leaf over lacquer (shippaku (漆箔)), crystal eyes (5 images) | 1001 standing Thousand-armed Kannon | 165.0–168.5 cm (65.0–66.3 in) | Sanjūsangen-dō, Myōhō-in (妙法院), Kyoto | Huge number of virtually identical Buddhist sculptures. |
| Fūjin and Raijin (木造〈風神／雷神〉像, mokuzō Fūjin-Raijin zō) or Wind God and Thunder God | — | Kamakura period, mid-13th century | Colored wood and crystal eyes | Standing Fūjin and standing Raijin | 111.5 cm (43.9 in) (Fūjin) and 100.0 cm (39.4 in) (Raijin) | Sanjūsangen-dō, Myōhō-in (妙法院), Kyoto | Fūjin. Three-quarter view of a statue. His left leg is bent as if climbing stairs and he is carrying a long bag-shaped object which goes from one shoulder to the other around the back of his head. Black and white photograph. |
| Bonten (木造梵天坐像, mokuzō bonten zazō) and Taishakuten in half-lotus position (帝釈天半跏像, taishakuten hankazō) | — | Heian period, 839 | Colored wood (faded) | Seated Bonten on a lotus pedestal carried by four geese and Taishakuten seated on an elephant in half-lotus position | 101.1 cm (39.8 in) (Bonten) and 110 cm (43 in) | Lecture Hall (講堂, kō-dō), Tō-ji, Kyoto | |
| Amida Nyorai and two sitting attendants (木造阿弥陀如来及両脇侍坐像, mokuzō amida nyorai oyobi ryōwakiji zazō) | — | Heian period, 1148 | Wood, gold leaf over lacquer (shippaku (漆箔)) | Sitting Amida Nyorai and two sitting attendants (Kannon and Seishi) | 233.0 cm (91.7 in) (Amida), 131.8 cm (51.9 in) (Kannon) and 130.9 cm (51.5 in) (Seishi) | Ōjō Gokuraku-in Amida Hall (往生極楽院, ōjō gokurakuin amidadō), Sanzen-in, Kyoto | |
| Amida Nyorai and two sitting attendants (木造阿弥陀如来及両脇侍坐像, mokuzō amida nyorai oyobi ryōwakiji zazō) | Former principal image of Seika-ji (棲霞寺) | Heian period, 896 | Wood, gold leaf over lacquer (shippaku (漆箔)) | Sitting Amida Nyorai and two sitting attendants (Kannon and Seishi) | 172.2 cm (67.8 in) (Amida), 165.7 cm (65.2 in) (Kannon) and 168.2 cm (66.2 in) (Seishi) | Seiryō-ji, Kyoto | |
| Amida Nyorai and two attendants (木造阿弥陀如来及両脇侍像, mokuzō amida nyorai oyobi ryōwakijizō) | Originally enshrined in the kon-dō | Heian period, 888 | Wood, gold leaf over lacquer (shippaku (漆箔)) | Sitting Amida Nyorai and two standing attendants (Kannon and Seishi) | 88.6 cm (34.9 in) (Amida), 123.4 cm (48.6 in) (Kannon) and 123.3 cm (48.5 in) (Seishi) | Treasure Hall (霊宝館, reihōkan), Ninna-ji, Kyoto | — |
| Amida Nyorai (木造阿弥陀如来坐像, mokuzō amida nyorai zazō) | — | Heian period, end of 11th century | Wood, gold leaf over lacquer (shippaku (漆箔)) | Sitting Amida Nyorai | 280.0 cm (110.2 in) | Amida Hall (阿弥陀堂, amidadō), Hōkai-ji (法界寺), Kyoto | |
| Amida Nyorai (木造阿弥陀如来坐像, mokuzō amida nyorai zazō) | By Inkaku | late Heian period, ca. 1130 | Wood | Seated Amida Nyorai | 224.0 cm (88.2 in) | Hōkongō-in, Kyoto | — |
| Amida Nyorai (木造阿弥陀如来坐像, mokuzō amida nyorai zazō) | — | Heian period, 840 | Wood, gold leaf over lacquer (shippaku (漆箔)) | Seated Amida Nyorai | 263.6 cm (103.8 in) | Lecture Hall (講堂, kō-dō), Kōryū-ji, Kyoto | |
| Nine Amida Nyorai (木造阿弥陀如来坐像, mokuzō amida nyorai zazō) | Nine statues representing the nine stages of nirvana | Heian period, ca. 1100 | Wood, gold leaf over lacquer (shippaku (漆箔)) | One central sitting Amida Nyorai flanked by four sitting Amida Nyorai on both sides | 224.2 cm (88.3 in) (central), 138.8–145.4 cm (54.6–57.2 in) (others) | Hon-dō, Jōruri-ji, Kizugawa, Kyoto | |
| Amida Nyorai (木造阿弥陀如来坐像, mokuzō amida nyorai zazō) | The principal image in the Phoenix Hall of Byōdō-in and only extant work by Jōchō | Heian period, 1053 | Wood, gold leaf over lacquer (shippaku (漆箔)) | Sitting Amida Nyorai | 283.9 cm (111.8 in) | Phoenix Hall (鳳凰堂, hōō-dō), Byōdō-in, Uji, Kyoto | |
| Bosatsu on clouds (木造雲中供養菩薩像, mokuzō unchū kuyō bosatsuzō) | Thought to accompany departed believers to Amida's Pure Land. | Heian period, 1053 | Wood, gold leaf over lacquer (shippaku (漆箔)), colored, partially cut-gold foil (kirikane (截金)) on wood | 52 Bosatsu on clouds attached to the wall | 40.0–87.0 cm (15.7–34.3 in) | Phoenix Hall (鳳凰堂, hōō-dō), Byōdō-in, Uji, Kyoto | |
| Tobatsu Bishamonten (木造兜跋毘沙門天立像, mokuzō tobatsu bishamonten ryūzō) | Formerly enshrined in the Bishamon Hall (毘沙門堂, bishamon-dō) | Tang dynasty, 9th century | Wood, gold leaf over lacquer (shippaku (漆箔)), colored, nerimono (練物) | Standing Bishamonten | 189.4 cm (74.6 in) | Treasure Hall (霊宝館, reihōkan), Tō-ji, Kyoto | |
| Five Great Kokūzō Bosatsu (Akasagarbha) (木造五大虚空蔵菩薩坐像, mokuzō godai kokūzō bosatsu zazō) | Five almost identical Great Kokūzō Bosatsu are enshrined in the two-storied pagoda. | Heian period, 9th century | Colored wood | Five sitting Kokūzō Bosatsu (Akasagarbha) | 94.2–99.1 cm (37.1–39.0 in) | Tahōtō, Jingo-ji, Kyoto | Front view of a statue in lotus position. The palm of the right hand is turned upward and held in front of the stomach. The left hand, close to the right foot, is holding a long pole with decorations at the end resembling a trident. |
| Five Great Bosatsu (木造五大菩薩坐像, mokuzō godai bosatsu zazō) | The central figure is excluded from the nomination being a later work. | Heian period, 839 | Wood | Four seated Bosatsu | 96.4 cm (38.0 in) | Lecture Hall (講堂, kō-dō), Tō-ji, Kyoto | The central Bosatsu (in back) and one of four Great Bosatsu. Three-quarter view of two cross-legged seated statues (one in front of the other). The statue in the back appears larger and shows the Vajra Mudrā, enclosing the index finger of the left hand with the fist of the right hand. The statue in front has both hands resting on the lap. |
| Five Wisdom Kings (木造五大明王像, mokuzō godai myōōzō) | — | Heian period, 839 | Colored wood | Five Wisdom Kings: sitting Acala, standing Trilokavijaya, Kundali and Vajrayaksa, Yamantaka riding a bull | 173.0 cm (68.1 in) (Acala), 174.0 cm (68.5 in) (Trilokavijaya), 201.0 cm (79.1 in) (Kundali), 143.0 cm (56.3 in) (Yamantaka), 172.0 cm (67.7 in) (Vajrayaksa) | Lecture Hall (講堂, kō-dō), Tō-ji, Kyoto | |
| Kōbō Daishi (Kūkai) (木造弘法大師坐像, mokuzō Kōbō Daishi zazō) | By Kōshō (康勝) | Kamakura period, 1233 | Colored wood, crystal eyes | Seated Kōbō Daishi (Kūkai) | 69.0 cm (27.2 in) | Miei Hall (御影堂, mieidō), Tō-ji, Kyoto | — |
| Four Heavenly Kings (木造四天王立像, mokuzō shitennō ryūzō) | — | late Heian period, 11th–12th century | Colored wood and cut-gold foil (kirikane (截金)) on wood | Standing Four Heavenly Kings | 169.7 cm (66.8 in) (Jikoku-ten), 169.7 cm (66.8 in) (Zōjō-ten), 168.8 cm (66.5 in) (Kōmoku-ten), 167.0 cm (65.7 in) (Tamon-ten) | Jōruri-ji, Kizugawa, Kyoto | |
| Four Heavenly Kings (木造四天王立像, mokuzō shitennō ryūzō) | — | Heian period, 839 | Wood | Standing Four Heavenly Kings | 183.0 cm (72.0 in) (Jikoku-ten), 184.2 cm (72.5 in) (Zōjō-ten), 171.8 cm (67.6 in) (Kōmoku-ten), 197.9 cm (77.9 in) (Tamon-ten) | Lecture Hall (講堂, kō-dō), Tō-ji, Kyoto | — |
| Shakyamuni (Shaka Nyorai) (木造釈迦如来立像, mokuzō shaka nyorai ryūzō) and objects found within the statue | Copy of lost Udayana Buddha by the Chinese sculptors and brothers Zhāng Yánjiǎo and Zhāng Yánxí. Brought to Japan from China in 986 by the monk Chōnen (奝然). Includes a model of the internal organs, made of silk and other materials, a paper with the seal of Chōnen and other items. Inscription of repair dated 1218 | Northern Song, 985 | Wood, natural wood surface (素地, kiji), cut-gold foil (kirikane (截金)) on wood | Standing Shakyamuni (Shaka Nyorai) | 160.0 cm (63.0 in) | Hon-dō, Seiryō-ji, Kyoto | |
| Eleven-faced Goddess of Mercy (木造十一面観音立像, mokuzō jūichimenkannon ryūzō) | — | Heian period, 951 | Wood | Standing Jūichimen Kannon | 258.0 cm (101.6 in) | Hon-dō, Rokuharamitsu-ji, Kyoto | — |
| Twelve Heavenly Generals (木造十二神将立像, mokuzō jūni shinshō ryūzō) | By Chōsei (長勢) | Heian period, 1064 | Colored wood | Standing Twelve Heavenly Generals | 123.0 cm (48.4 in) (Kumbhira), 115.1 cm (45.3 in) (Andira) | Treasure House (霊宝殿, reihōden), Kōryū-ji, Kyoto | |
| Thousand-armed Kannon (木造千手観音坐像, mokuzō senjū kannon zazō) | The principal image of Sanjūsangen-dō. By Tankei. | Kamakura period, 1251–1254 | Wood, gold leaf over lacquer (shippaku (漆箔)), crystal eyes | Seated Thousand-armed Kannon | 334.8 cm (131.8 in) | Sanjūsangen-dō, Myōhō-in (妙法院), Kyoto | Front view of a cross-legged seated statue with many arms positioned in a circular fashion around the body carrying various objects like bells and staffs. One pair of hands is folded in front of the body in prayer. The statue is positioned on a flower-shaped platform. |
| Thousand-armed Kannon (木造千手観音立像, mokuzō senjū kannon ryūzō) | — | Heian period, ca. 934 | Colored wood (faded) | Standing Thousand-armed Kannon | 109.7 cm (43.2 in) | Hosshō-ji, Kyoto | |
| Thousand-armed Kannon (木造千手観音立像, mokuzō senjū kannon ryūzō) | — | Heian period, before 873 | Colored wood (faded) | Standing Thousand-armed Kannon | 266.0 cm (104.7 in) | Lecture Hall (講堂, kō-dō), Kōryū-ji, Kyoto | — |
| Hachiman in the guise of a seated monk (木造僧形八幡神坐像, mokuzō sōgyō hachimanjin zazō) and two Goddesses (木造女神坐像, mokuzō joshin zazō) | — | Heian period, 9th century | hinoki wood-core dry lacquer (木心乾漆 (mokushin kanshitsu)), painted or gilded | Seated Hachiman and two seated attendant goddesses | c. 110 cm (43 in) each | Tō-ji, Kyoto | — |
| Canopy (木造天蓋, mokuzō tengai) | — | Heian period, 1053 | Wood | n/a | — | Phoenix Hall (鳳凰堂, hōō-dō), Byōdō-in, Uji, Kyoto | |
| Twenty eight attendants (木造二十八部衆立像, mokuzō nijūhachi bushū ryūzō) | — | Kamakura period, mid 13th century | Colored wood (faded) and cut-gold foil (kirikane (截金)) on wood, crystal eyes | Standing 28 attendants of the Thousand-armed Kannon (千手観音, senjū kannon). | 153.6–169.7 cm (60.5–66.8 in) | Sanjūsangen-dō, Myōhō-in (妙法院), Kyoto | One of the Twenty eight attendants. Three-quarter view of a statue carrying a handdrum in front. A halo is visible around his head. |
| Bishamonten, Kichijōten, Zennishi Dōji (木造毘沙門天及〈吉祥天／善膩師童子〉立像〉, mokuzō bishamonten kichijōten zennishi dōji ryūzō) | — | Heian period, 1127 | Wood, natural wood surface (素地, kiji) | Bishamonten accompanied by his wife Kichijōten and her son Zennishi Dōji (all standing) | 175.7 cm (69.2 in) (Bishamonten) | Hon-dō, Kurama-dera, Kyoto | |
| Fukū Kensaku Kannon (木造不空羂索観音立像, mokuzō fukū kensaku kannon ryūzō) | Formerly enshrined in the Lecture Hall (講堂, kō-dō) | Heian period, ca. 800 | Colored wood (faded) | Standing Fukū Kensaku Kannon | 313.6 cm (123.5 in) | Treasure House (霊宝殿), Kōryū-ji, Kyoto | Front view of a standing statue with robes four pairs of arms. Each pair is almost left-right symmetric. Two hands are placed as in prayer with palms facing each other in front of the body. Other pairs of arms are in various positions holding flowers, a short object shaped like a flute, a necklace and long pole weapons. There is a large halo behind the head of the statue. |
| Fudō Myōō (Acala) (木造不動明王坐像, mokuzō fudō myōō zazō) and Canopy (木造天蓋, mokuzō tengai) | — | Heian period, second half of 9th century | Wood | Seated Acala and canopy | 123.0 cm (48.4 in) | Miei Hall (御影堂, miei-dō), Tō-ji, Kyoto | |
| Bodhisattva in half-lotus position (木造菩薩半跏像, mokuzō bosatsu hankazō) or Nyoirin Kannon (如意輪観音) | — | Heian period, 9th century, Jōgan era | Wood, natural wood surface (素地, kiji) | Nyoirin Kannon in half-lotus position | 88.2 cm (34.7 in) | Hon-dō, Gantoku-ji (願徳寺), Kyoto | — |
| Miroku Bosatsu in half-lotus position (木造弥勒菩薩半跏像, mokuzō miroku bosatsu hankazō) or hōkan miroku (宝冠弥勒) | Possibly imported to Japan from Korea. One of the oldest items in the list. | Asuka period, 7th century | Japanese Red Pine wood, gold leaf over lacquer (shippaku (漆箔)) | Miroku Bosatsu in half-lotus position | 84.2 cm (33.1 in) | Treasure House (霊宝殿, reihōden), Kōryū-ji, Kyoto | Three-quarter view of a seated statue in half-lotus position. The right foot rests on the left upper leg, the right elbow rests on the right knee with the right hand close to the head in contemplating pose. |
| Miroku Bosatsu in half-lotus position (木造弥勒菩薩半跏像, mokuzō miroku bosatsu hankazō) or Weeping Miroku (泣き弥勒, naki miroku) | Possibly made in Japan | Asuka period, ca. 700 | Camphorwood, gold leaf over lacquer (shippaku (漆箔)) | Miroku Bosatsu in half-lotus position | 66.4 cm (26.1 in) | Treasure House (霊宝殿, reihōden), Kōryū-ji, Kyoto | |
| Yakushi Nyorai and two attendants (木造薬師如来及両脇侍像, mokuzō yakushi nyorai oyobi ryōkyōjizō) | Formerly enshrined in the Yakushi Hall (薬師堂) | Heian period, 913 | Hinoki wood, gold leaf over lacquer (shippaku (漆箔)) | Seated Yakushi Nyorai (healing Buddha) and two standing attendants: Nikkō Bosatsu and Gakkō Bosatsu (Bodhisattvas of sun and moon light) | 176.5 cm (69.5 in) (Yakushi) | Treasure House (霊宝館, reihōkan), Daigo-ji, Kyoto | — |
| Kokūzō Bosatsu (Akasagarbha) (木造虚空蔵菩薩立像, mokuzō kokūzō bosatsu ritsuzō) | Also known as Shō Kannon; notable for its complex heavenly garment | early Heian period, 9th century | Colored wood | Standing Kokūzō Bosatsu (Akasagarbha) | 51.5 cm (20.3 in) | Daigo-ji, Kyoto | — |
| Yakushi Nyorai (木造薬師如来坐像, mokuzō yakushi nyorai zazō) | By Ensei (円勢) and Chōen (長円). Halo with Seven Buddhas of healing (七仏薬師, shichibutsu yakushi), Nikkō Bosatsu and Gakkō Bosatsu. Pedestal with Twelve Heavenly Generals (十二神将, jūni shinshō) | Heian period, 1103 | Sandalwood, natural wood surface (素地, kiji), cut-gold foil (kirikane (截金)) on wood | Seated Yakushi Nyorai | 10.7 cm (4.2 in) | Reimeiden (霊明殿), Ninna-ji, Kyoto | — |
| Yakushi Nyorai (木造薬師如来立像, mokuzō yakushi nyorai ryūzō) | Principal image of Jingo-ji's predecessor temple Jingan-ji (神願寺) | Heian period, end of 8th century | Wood, natural wood surface (素地, kiji) | Standing Yakushi Nyorai | 169.7 cm (66.8 in) | Kon-dō, Jingo-ji, Kyoto | |
| Six Kannon (木造六観音菩薩像, mokuzō roku kannon bosatsuzō) and Jizō Bosatsu (木造地蔵菩薩立像, mokuzō jizō bosatsu ryūzō) | By Higo Jōkei. Only complete extant example of a roku kannon group. | Kamakura period, 1224 | Colored wood | Standing group of Six manifestations of Avalokitesvara and standing Jizō bosatsu | 162.7 cm (64.1 in) (Jizō), 95.5–181.8 cm (37.6–71.6 in) (Jizō) | Daihōon-ji, Kyoto | — |
| Thousand-armed Kannon (乾漆千手観音坐像, kanshitsu senjū kannon zazō) | The statue has a total of 1041 arms: 2 main arms with the hand palms facing each other in front of the statue, 38 large and 1001 small arms extending from behind the body. | Nara period, middle of 8th century | Dry lacquer (乾漆, kanshitsu), Gold leaf over lacquer (漆箔, shippaku) | Seated Thousand-armed Kannon | 131.3 cm (51.7 in) | Hon-dō, Fujii-dera, Fujiidera, Osaka | Thousand armed Kannon Fujii dera |
| Eleven-faced Goddess of Mercy (木造十一面観音立像, mokuzō jūichimenkannon ryūzō) | — | Heian period, beginning of 9th century | Wood, natural wood surface (素地, kiji) | Standing Jūichimen Kannon | 99.4 cm (39.1 in) | Hon-dō, Dōmyō-ji, Fujiidera, Osaka | Portrait of a statue in three-quarter view with a full face and elongated earlobes. Small faces are located on top of its head. |
| Nyoirin Kannon (木造如意輪観音坐像, mokuzō nyoirin kannon zazō) | One of three masterpiece images of Nyoirin Kannon called San Nyoirin (三如意輪). | Heian period, ca. 840 | Colored wood | Seated Nyoirin Kannon with one knee pulled up | 108.8 cm (42.8 in) | Kon-dō, Kanshin-ji, Kawachinagano, Osaka | Three-quarter view of a seated statue with six arms. The left leg is bent, touching the ground along its whole length. The right leg is also bent, but with the knee up. The right foot is above the left foot. One of the right hands is touching the right ear, another is lifting a jewel-shaped object in front of the breast. One of the left hands carries a flower, another a small wheel-shaped object. |
| Dainichi Nyorai (木造大日如来坐像, mokuzō dainichi nyorai zazō), Fudō Myōō and Trailokyavijaya (木造不動降三世明王坐像, mokuzō fudō gōzanze myōō zazō) | Fudō Myōō is a work of Gyōkai (行快), a disciple of Kaikei. The three sculptures were made over a 50-year period | Heian period, ca. 1180 (Dainichi Nyorai) and early Kamakura Period (Fudō Myōō from 1234) | Colored wood | Seated Dainichi Nyorai, Fudō Myōō and Trailokyavijaya | 313.5 cm (123.4 in) (Dainichi Nyorai), 201.7 cm (79.4 in) (Fudō Myōō) and 230.1 cm (90.6 in) (Trailokyavijaya) | Kongō-ji, Kawachinagano, Osaka | — |
| Yakushi Nyorai (木造薬師如来坐像, mokuzō yakushi nyorai zazō) | — | Heian period, ca. 900 | Wood, natural wood surface (素地, kiji) | Seated Yakushi Nyorai | 92.9 cm (36.6 in) | Hon-dō, Shishikutsu-ji (獅子窟寺), Katano, Osaka | |
| Amida Nyorai and two standing attendants (木造阿弥陀如来及両脇侍立像, mokuzō amida nyorai oyobi ryōwakiji ryūzō) | The wooden core of the statues was covered with lacquer on which gold foil was pressed. | Kamakura period, 1195 | Wood, gold leaf over lacquer (shippaku (漆箔)) | Standing Amida Nyorai and two standing attendants | 530.0 cm (208.7 in) (Amida), 371.0 cm (146.1 in) (each attendant) | Hon-dō (Amida Hall (阿弥陀堂) or Jōdo-dō (浄土堂)), Jōdo-ji, Ono, Hyōgo | Front view of three standing statues which are covered in gold. The central statue is about two heads taller than the two falnking statues. It has the right hand pointing down with the palm towards the viewer and the palm of the left hand turned upward with the thumb touching the middle figer. All three statues have halos behind their heads with emanating rays. |
| Bonten (乾漆梵天立像, kanshitsu bonten ryūzō) and Taishakuten (乾漆帝釈天立像, kanshitsu taishakuten ryūzō) | — | Nara period, 8th century | Hollow dry lacquer (脱活乾漆造, dakkatsu kanshitsu zukuri), colored | Standing Bonten and standing Taishakuten | 403.0 cm (158.7 in) (Bonten), 378.8 cm (149.1 in) (Taishakuten) | Hokke-dō (法華堂), Tōdai-ji, Nara, Nara | |
| Yakushi Nyorai (木造薬師如来立像, mokuzō yakushi nyorai ryūzō), Shuhō-ō Bosatsu (木造伝衆宝王菩薩立像, mokuzō den shūhō-ō bosatsu ryūzō), Shishiku Bosatsu (木造伝獅子吼菩薩立像, mokuzō den shishiku bosatsu ryūzō), Daijizaiō Bosatsu (木造伝大自在王菩薩立像, mokuzō den shishiku bosatsu ryūzō), Nitennō (木造二天王立像, mokuzō nitennō ryūzō) | Important examples of early Japanese sculpture. | Nara period, 8th century | Wood | various standing Buddhist images | 163.7 cm (64.4 in) (Yakushi Nyorai), 173.5 cm (68.3 in) (Shuhō-ō Bosatsu, 170.8 cm (67.2 in) (Shishiku Bosatsu, 170.8 cm (67.2 in) (Daijizaiō Bosatsu), 131.0 cm (51.6 in) (Jikoku-ten), 130.2 cm (51.3 in) (Zojo-ten) | Tōshōdai-ji, Nara, Nara | |
| Priest Ganjin (Jianzhen) (乾漆鑑真和上坐像, kanshitsu ganjin wajō zazō) | — | Nara period, 763 | Hollow dry lacquer (脱活乾漆造, dakkatsu kanshitsu zukuri), colored | Seated Ganjin | 80.1 cm (31.5 in) | Founder's Hall (開山堂, kaisan-dō), Tōshōdai-ji, Nara, Nara | |
| Kongōrikishi (Niō) (乾漆金剛力士立像, kanshitsu kongōrikishi ryūzō) | Niō in armour. There is another pair of Kongōrikishi (national treasure) in Nandaimon (南大門), Tōdai-ji. | Nara period, 8th century | Hollow dry lacquer (脱活乾漆造, dakkatsu kanshitsu zukuri), colored, gold leaf over lacquer (shippaku (漆箔)) | Standing pair of Niō: Agyō (阿形) and Ungyō (吽形) | 326.3 cm (128.5 in) (Agyō) and 306.0 cm (120.5 in) (Ungyō) | Hokke-dō (法華堂), Tōdai-ji, Nara, Nara | |
| Priest Gyōshin (乾漆行信僧都坐像, kanshitsu gyōshin sōzu zazō) | Statue of the founder of the Hall of Dreams (夢殿, yumedono) | Nara period, second half of 8th century | Dry lacquer (乾漆, kanshitsu) | Seated Gyōshin | 89.7 cm (35.3 in) | Hall of Dreams (夢殿, yumedono), Hōryū-ji, Ikaruga, Nara | |
| Four Heavenly Kings (乾漆四天王立像, kanshitsu shitennō ryūzō) | — | Nara period, 8th century | Hollow dry lacquer (脱活乾漆造, dakkatsu kanshitsu zukuri), colored | Standing Four Heavenly Kings | 308.5 cm (121.5 in) (Jikoku-ten), 300.0 cm (118.1 in) (Zōjō-ten), 315.1 cm (124.1 in) (Kōmoku-ten), 312.1 cm (122.9 in) (Tamon-ten) | Hokke-dō (法華堂), Tōdai-ji, Nara, Nara | |
| The ten principal disciples (乾漆十大弟子立像, kanshitsu jū daideshi ryūzō) | Four statues of the group of 10 are lost. Originally enshrined in the Western Golden Hall (西金堂) surrounding the principal Shaka Nyorai image there | Nara period, 734 | Hollow dry lacquer (脱活乾漆造, dakkatsu kanshitsu zukuri), colored | Standing six of The ten principal disciples: Furuna, Mokuren, Sharihotsu, Kasennen, Ragora, Shubodai | 148.8 cm (58.6 in) (Furuna), 149.1 cm (58.7 in) (Mokuren), 154.8 cm (60.9 in) (Sharihotsu), 146.0 cm (57.5 in) (Kasennen), 148.8 cm (58.6 in) (Ragora), 147.6 cm (58.1 in) (Shubodai) | Kōfuku-ji, Nara, Nara | |
| Eight Legions (乾漆八部衆立像（内一躯下半身欠失）, kanshitsu hachibushū ryūzō) | Of one figure, Gobujō, only the upper part of the body remains. The Ashura of this group is among the most famous sculptures in Japan. | Nara period, 734 | Hollow dry lacquer (脱活乾漆造, dakkatsu kanshitsu zukuri), colored | Standing Eight Legions: Ashura, Gobujō (五部浄), Kinnara, Sakara/Shakara (沙羯羅), Hibakara (畢婆迦羅), Kubanda, Kendatsuba, Garuda | 153.0 cm (60.2 in) (Ashura), 48.8 cm (19.2 in) (fragments of Gobujō), 149.1 cm (58.7 in) (Kinnara), 153.6 cm (60.5 in) (Shakara), 156.0 cm (61.4 in) (Hibakara), 151.2 cm (59.5 in) (Kubanda), 160.3 cm (63.1 in) (Kendatsuba), 149.7 cm (58.9 in) (Garuda) | Kōfuku-ji, Nara, Nara | Front view of a standing statue with six arms and three faces. One pair of hands is joined in front of the body with the palms facing each other as if praying. A second set of arms is bent to the sides with the palms of the hands pointing upwards. Also the third pair of arms is bent somewhere between the positions of the other pairs of arms. The three faces point to the front and both sides of the statue. The statue is embellished with sculpted and painted wide three-quarter length trousers and sandals. |
| Fukū Kensaku Kannon (乾漆不空羂索観音立像, kanshitsu fukū kensaku kannon ryūzō) | — | Nara period, 8th century | Hollow dry lacquer (脱活乾漆造, dakkatsu kanshitsu zukuri), gold leaf over lacquer (shippaku (漆箔)) | Standing Fukū Kensaku Kannon | 362.1 cm (142.6 in) | Hokke-dō (法華堂), Tōdai-ji, Nara, Nara | Portrait of a deity with elongated earlobes, a crown with a small figure and emanating rays. |
| Yakushi Nyorai (乾漆薬師如来坐像, kanshitsu yakushi nyorai zazō) | Principal image of the West Octagonal Hall (西円堂,, saien-dō). One of three national treasure Yakushi Nyorai at Hōryū-ji. The others are located in the Kon-dō and in the Large Lecture Hall (大講堂,, daikō-dō). | Nara period, 8th century | Hollow dry lacquer (脱活乾漆造, dakkatsu kanshitsu zukuri), gold leaf over lacquer (shippaku (漆箔)) | Seated Yakushi Nyorai (healing Buddha) | 244.5 cm (96.3 in) | West Octagonal Hall (西円堂,, saien-dō), Hōryū-ji, Ikaruga, Nara | |
| Rushana Buddha (乾漆盧舎那仏坐像, rushanabutsu zazō) | — | Nara period, 8th century | Hollow dry lacquer (脱活乾漆造, dakkatsu kanshitsu zukuri), gold leaf over lacquer (shippaku (漆箔)) | Seated Rushana Buddha | 304.5 cm (119.9 in) | Kon-dō, Tōshōdai-ji, Nara, Nara | |
| Nikkō Bosatsu (塑造日光仏立像, sozō nikkō butsu ryūzō) and Gakkō Bosatsu (塑造月光仏立像, sozō gakkō butsu ryūzō) | — | Nara period, 8th century | Colored clay, cut-gold foil (kirikane (截金)) on clay | Standing Nikkō Bosatsu and Gakkō Bosatsu (Bodhisattvas of sun and moon light) | 206.3 cm (81.2 in) (Nikkō), 206.8 cm (81.4 in) (Gakkō) | Hokke-dō (法華堂), Tōdai-ji, Nara, Nara | |
| Four Heavenly Kings (塑造四天王立像, sozō shitennō ryūzō) | — | Nara period, 8th century | Colored clay | Standing Four Heavenly Kings | 160.6 cm (63.2 in) (Jikoku-ten), 165.4 cm (65.1 in) (Zōjō-ten), 162.7 cm (64.1 in) (Kōmoku-ten), 164.5 cm (64.8 in) (Tamon-ten) | Kaidan Hall (戒壇堂, kaidan-dō), Tōdai-ji, Nara, Nara | Tamonten, one of the Four Heavenly Kings in the Kaidan Hall. Portrait of a statue in front view. The right arm is raised, the hair sculpted with a top knot and the breast with armour. Narrow slit eyes and a facial expression as if frowning. |
| Shukongōshin (塑造執金剛神立像, sozō shukongōshin ryūzō) | Mentioned in the Nihon Ryōiki as the statue which aided the priest Rōben | Nara period, mid 8th century | Colored clay | Standing Shukongōshin | 173.9 cm (68.5 in) | Hokke-dō (法華堂), Tōdai-ji, Nara, Nara | Frontal view of a fierce looking statue dressed in armour and wielding a stick-like object in his right hand. |
| Twelve Heavenly Generals (塑造十二神将立像, sozō jūni shinshō ryūzō) (Note: The temple uses a different association of statues with names of the generals than the national treasure nomination. Here the temple scheme is used.) | Statues are placed in a circle surrounding Yakushi Nyorai. Oldest extant sculptures of the Twelve Heavenly Generals. One statue, Haira (波夷羅), dated 1931 is excluded from the nomination. Each of the twelve statues' heads is adorned with one of the twelve animals of the zodiac. | Nara period, 729–749 | Colored clay | Standing eleven of the Twelve Heavenly Generals: Bazara (伐折羅), Anira (頞儞羅), Bigyara (毘羯羅), Makora (摩虎羅), Kubira (宮毘羅), Shōtora (招杜羅), Shintara (真達羅), Santera (珊底羅), Meikira (迷企羅), Antera (安底羅), Indara (因達羅) | 162.9 cm (64.1 in) (Bazara), 154.2 cm (60.7 in) (Anira), 162.1 cm (63.8 in) (Bigyara), 170.1 cm (67.0 in) (Makora), 165.1 cm (65.0 in) (Kubira), 167.6 cm (66.0 in) (Shōtora), 165.5 cm (65.2 in) (Shintara), 161.8 cm (63.7 in) (Santera), 159.5 cm (62.8 in) (Meikira), 153.6 cm (60.5 in) (Antera), 155.2 cm (61.1 in) (Indara) | Hon-dō, Shin-Yakushi-ji, Nara, Nara | |
| Four sculpted scenes in the pagoda (塑造塔本四面具, sozō tōhon shimengu) | Four groups in the cardinal directions depicting scenes from the life of Buddha | Nara period, 711 | Colored clay, gold leaf over lacquer (shippaku (漆箔)) | Total of 78 statues and two other objects: Miroku Bosatsu leaning against an elephant (S); seated Yuimakoji, seated Monju Bosatsu and 14 attendants (E); Dying Buddha (涅槃釈迦, nehan shaka) (Shaka Nyorai) and 31 attendants (N); Gold coffin, reliquary and 29 attendants (W) | 81.0 cm (31.9 in) (Miroku Bosatsu), 98.0 cm (38.6 in) (Shaka Nyorai), 45.2 cm (17.8 in) (Yuimakoji), 52.4 cm (20.6 in) (Monju Bosatsu), 25.6 cm (10.1 in) (gold coffin), 37.3 cm (14.7 in) (reliquary) | Five-storied pagoda (五重塔, gojūnotō), Hōryū-ji, Ikaruga, Nara | |
| Priest Dōsen (塑造道詮律師坐像, sozō dōsen risshi zazō) | — | Heian period, ca. 873 | Colored clay | Seated Dōsen | 88.2 cm (34.7 in) | Hall of Dreams (夢殿, yumedono), Hōryū-ji, Ikaruga, Nara | |
| Miroku Bosatsu (塑造弥勒仏坐像, sozō miroku butsu zazō) | Oldest extant Miroku Bosatsu statue in Japan | Asuka period, second half of 7th century | Clay, gold leaf over lacquer (shippaku (漆箔)) | Seated Miroku Bosatsu | 219.7 cm (86.5 in) | Kon-dō, Taima-dera, Nara, Nara | |
| Amida Nyorai and two attendants (銅造阿弥陀如来及両脇侍像, dōzō amida nyorai oyobi ryōwakijizō) and miniature shrine (木造厨子, mokuzō zushi) | Buddhist image for personal daily worship (nenjibutsu (念持仏)), dedicated by Lady Tachibana (橘夫人, tachibana fujin) | Asuka period, end of 7th century | Gilded bronze, yuga (油画) oil painting on wood for the shrine | Seated Amida Nyorai and two standing attendants (Kannon and Seishi) | 33.3 cm (13.1 in) (Amida), 27.0 cm (10.6 in) (each attendant) | Treasure House (大宝蔵殿, daihōzōden), Hōryū-ji, Ikaruga, Nara | |
| Kannon (銅造観音菩薩立像, dōzō kannon bosatsu ryūzō) or Shō Kannon (聖観音) | Influenced by Indian sculpture of the Gupta period | Asuka period, early 8th century | Gilded bronze | Standing Kannon | 188.9 cm (74.4 in) | Tōin-dō (東院堂), Yakushi-ji, Nara, Nara | |
| Kannon (銅造観音菩薩立像, dōzō kannon bosatsu ryūzō) or Yumechigai Kannon (夢違観音) | Its common name derives from the belief that the statue could change bad dreams into good dreams. Formerly the principal statue of the Tōin eden (東院絵殿). One of four national treasure standing Kannon Bosatsu statues at Hōryū-ji. Two more are also in the Great Treasure Gallery (大宝蔵院, daihōzō-in), while the third Kannon Bosatsu is enshrined in the Hall of Dreams (夢殿, yumedono). | Asuka period, ca. 700 | Gilded bronze | Standing Kannon | 87.0 cm (34.3 in) | Great Treasure Gallery (大宝蔵院, daihōzō-in), Hōryū-ji, Ikaruga, Nara | Frontal view of a statue on a pedestal with the left hand raised to breast height. The left hand carries a small object shaped like a vase or pot. |
| Shakyamuni (Shaka Nyorai) and two attendants (銅造釈迦如来及両脇侍像, dōzō shaka nyorai oyobi ryōwakijizō) | By Tori Busshi. One of the most treasured pieces of early Japanese bronze sculpture. It is said to be modelled after Prince Shōtoku. | Asuka period, 623 | Gilded bronze | Seated Shaka Nyorai and two standing attendants | 86.4 cm (34.0 in) (Shaka), 90.7 cm (35.7 in) (left att.), 92.4 cm (36.4 in) (right att.) | Kon-dō, Hōryū-ji, Ikaruga, Nara | Front view of a central figure sitting cross-legged on a raised platform which is flanked by two smaller standing statues. The central figure has the palm of his right hand turned to the front. The attendants look identical pointing upwards with their right hand and their left hand lifted halfway touching the thumb with the middle finger. Each of the three statues has a halo. |
| Canopies (木造天蓋, mokuzō tengai) | Three box-shaped canopies suspended from the ceiling. Western canopy by Kōshō (康勝). | Asuka period, late 7th century (central and eastern canopy) and Kamakura period, 1233 (western canopy) | Wood, painted | n/a | 163.4 cm × 307.7 cm × 280.8 cm (64.3 in × 121.1 in × 110.6 in) (western), 191.5 cm × 342.2 cm × 266.8 cm (75.4 in × 134.7 in × 105.0 in) (central), 124.0 cm × 272.9 cm × 287.7 cm (48.8 in × 107.4 in × 113.3 in) (eastern) | Kon-dō, Hōryū-ji, Ikaruga, Nara | — |
| Shaka at Birth (銅造誕生釈迦仏立像, dōzō tanjō shaka butsu ryūzō) and ablution basin (銅造灌仏盤, dōzō kanbutsuban) | — | Nara period, second half of 8th century | Gilded bronze | Standing Shaka at birth in ablution basin | 47.5 cm (18.7 in) (Shaka), diameter of bowl: 89.4 cm (35.2 in) | Kōkei-dō (公慶堂), Tōdai-ji, Nara, Nara | |
| Buddha head (Buttō) (銅造仏頭, ｄōzō buttō) | Former principal image in the Lecture Hall (講堂, kō-dō) of Yamada-dera (山田寺) | Asuka period, 668 | Gilded bronze | Buttō | 98.3 cm (38.7 in) | National Treasure House (国宝館, kokuhōkan), Kōfuku-ji, Nara, Nara | A Buddha head in three-quarter view with elongated earlobe, thick lips, narrow slit eyes and broad nose. |
| Yakushi Nyorai and two attendants (銅造薬師如来及両脇侍像, dōzō yakushi nyorai oyobi ryōkyōjizō) | Yakushi Nyorai is placed on a 150 cm (59 in) high pedestal combining elements of different cultures of the world: grape-vine (Greek), lotus flower pattern (Mideast), crouching barbarians (India), dragon, tiger and tortoise (China). Unusually, the Yakushi does not carry a medicine pot in his hand. | Nara period, ca. 718 | Gilded bronze | Seated Yakushi Nyorai (healing Buddha) and two standing attendants: Nikkō Bosatsu and Gakkō Bosatsu (Bodhisattvas of sun and moon light) | 254.7 cm (100.3 in) (Yakushi), 317.3 cm (124.9 in) (Nikkō), 315.3 cm (124.1 in) (Gakkō) | Kon-dō, Yakushi-ji, Nara, Nara | Three-quarter view of a central cross-legged seated statue on a pedestal flanked by two standing statues of almost the same size. The central figure has the palm of his right hand facing forward and that of the left hand upwards with the left hand resting on his knee. The flanking statues show a similar pose with their right hand while their left arm is hanging down. All three statues have halos in their back which are decorated with small cross-legged seated statues. |
| Yakushi Nyorai (銅造薬師如来坐像, dōzō yakushi nyorai zazō) | One of three national treasure Yakushi Nyorai at Hōryū-ji. The others are located in the West Octagonal Hall (西円堂,, saien-dō) and in the Large Lecture Hall (大講堂,, daikō-dō). | Asuka period, 607 | Gilded bronze | Seated Yakushi Nyorai | 63.0 cm (24.8 in) | Kon-dō, Hōryū-ji, Ikaruga, Nara | |
| Rushana Buddha (銅造盧舎那仏坐像, dōzō rushanabutsu zazō) or Great Buddha of Nara | The largest statue in this list and the largest gilt bronze statue in the world, and the main hall of Tōdai-ji, in which it is located, is the largest wooden structure in the world. | Nara period, 752. Head is a recast from the Edo period, hands date to the Momoyama period | Gilded bronze | Seated Rushana Buddha | 14.868m | Kon-dō, Tōdai-ji, Nara, Nara | Three-quarter view and worm's-eye view of a seated statue. The palm of his right hand faces forward. The folds in his clothing are deeply sculpted. Behind the head of the sculpture there is a halo decorated with sitting statues. Color picture. |
| Miroku Bosatsu (木造弥勒仏坐像, mokuzō miroku butsu zazō) | — | early Heian period | Wood | Seated Miroku Bosatsu | 39.0 cm (15.4 in) | Hokke-dō (法華堂), Tōdai-ji, Nara, Nara | — |
| Twelve Heavenly Generals (板彫十二神将立像, itabori jūni shinshō ryūzō) | — | Heian period, 11th century | Wooden tablets, relief carving (板彫, itabori), coloring, cut-gold foil (kirikane (截金)) on wood | Standing Twelve Heavenly Generals | 87.9–100.3 cm (34.6–39.5 in) | National Treasure House (国宝館, kokuhōkan), Kōfuku-ji, Nara, Nara | |
| Priest Gien (木心乾漆義淵僧正坐像, mokushin kanshitsu gien sōjō zazō) | Priest Gien was the founder of Oka-dera. | Nara period, 8th century | Wood-core dry lacquer (木心乾漆, mokushin kanshitsu), colored | Seated Gien | 93.0 cm (36.6 in) | Oka-dera, Asuka, Nara | |
| Four Heavenly Kings (木心乾漆四天王立像, mokushin kanshitsu shitennō ryūzō) | There are four sets of Four Heavenly Kings designated as national treasure at Kōfuku-ji. (Note: The four national treasure sets of Four Heavenly Kings at Kōfuku-ji are located in the Eastern Golden Hall (東金堂,, tōkon-dō), the North Octagonal Hall (北円堂, hokuen-dō), and two groups in the South Octagonal Hall (南円堂, nanendō).) | Nara period, 791 | Wood-core dry lacquer (木心乾漆, mokushin kanshitsu), colored | Standing Four Heavenly Kings | 138.2 cm (54.4 in) (Jikoku-ten), 136.0 cm (53.5 in) (Zōjō-ten), 139.1 cm (54.8 in) (Kōmoku-ten), 134.5 cm (53.0 in) (Tamon-ten) | North Octagonal Hall (北円堂, hokuen-dō), Kōfuku-ji, Nara, Nara | |
| Monju Bosatsu and attendants (木造騎獅文殊菩薩及脇侍像, mokuzō kishi monjubosatsu oyobi kyōjizō) | By Kaikei. Largest Monju image in Japan | Kamakura period, 1203 | Colored wood | Monju Bosatsu riding a lion and four attendants | 198.0 cm (78.0 in) (Monju Bosatsu), 134.7 cm (53.0 in) (Zenzai Dōji), 268.7 cm (105.8 in) (Utennō), 187.2 cm (73.7 in) (Butsudahari Sanzō), | Abe Monju-in, Sakurai, Nara | — |
| Eleven-faced Goddess of Mercy (木心乾漆十一面観音立像, mokushin kanshitsu jūichimenkannon ryūzō) | — | Nara period, second half of 8th century | Wood-core dry lacquer (木心乾漆, mokushin kanshitsu), gold leaf over lacquer (shippaku (漆箔)) | Standing Jūichimen Kannon | 209.1 cm (82.3 in) | Daibiden (大悲殿), Shōrin-ji (聖林寺), Sakurai, Nara | |
| Thousand-armed Kannon (木心乾漆千手観音立像, mokushin kanshitsu senjū kannon ryūzō) | — | Nara period, second half of 8th century | Wood-core dry lacquer (木心乾漆, mokushin kanshitsu), gold leaf over lacquer (shippaku (漆箔)) | Standing Thousand-armed Kannon | 535.7 cm (210.9 in) | Kon-dō, Tōshōdai-ji, Nara, Nara | |
| Yakushi Nyorai (木心乾漆薬師如来立像, mokushin kanshitsu yakushi nyorai ryūzō) | — | Heian period, 796–815 | Wood-core dry lacquer (木心乾漆, mokushin kanshitsu), gold leaf over lacquer (shippaku (漆箔)) | Standing Yakushi Nyorai | 369.7 cm (145.6 in) | Kon-dō, Tōshōdai-ji, Nara, Nara | |
| Hachiman in the guise of a Buddhist monk (木造僧形八幡神坐像, mokuzō sōgyō hachimanjin zazō), Empress Jingū (木造神功皇后坐像, mokuzō jingūkōgō zazō), Nakatsuhime (木造仲津姫命坐像, mokuzō nakatsuhime zazō) | Oldest statues of their kind in Japan | Heian period, 889–898 | Colored wood | Seated Hachiman, Empress Jingū and Nakatsuhime | 38.8 cm (15.3 in) (Hachiman), 33.9 cm (13.3 in) (Jingū), 36.8 cm (14.5 in) (Nakatsuhime) | Chinju Hachimangu (鎮守八幡宮), Yakushi-ji, Nara, Nara | |
| Tentōki (木造天燈鬼立像, mokuzō tentōki ryūzō) and Ryūtōki (木造竜燈鬼立像, mokuzō ryūtōki ryūzō) | Tentoki attributed to Kōben (康弁), Ryūtoki by Kōben. Tentōki is a creature unique to Japan and Ryūtōki carries a lantern as offering to the Historical Buddha. | Kamakura period, c. 1215–1216 | Colored wood, crystal eyes | Standing Tentōki (lantern on hand/shoulder) and Ryūtōki (lantern on head) | 77.9 cm (30.7 in) (Tentōki), 77.3 cm (30.4 in) (Ryūtōki) | Kōfuku-ji, Nara, Nara | |
| Muchaku (木造無著菩薩立像, mokuzō muchaku bosatsu ryūzō) and Seshin (木造世親菩薩立像, mokuzō seshin bosatsu ryūzō) | By Unkei | Kamakura period, c. 1208–1212 | Colored wood, crystal eyes | Standing Muchaku and Seshin. | 193.0 cm (76.0 in) (Muchaku), 190.9 cm (75.2 in) (Seshin) | North Octagonal Hall (北円堂, hokuen-dō), Kōfuku-ji, Nara, Nara | |
| Bonten (木造梵天立像, mokuzō bonten ryūzō) and Taishakuten (木造帝釈天立像, mokuzō taishakuten ryūzō) | — | Nara period, second half of 8th century | Colored wood | Standing Bonten and standing Taishakuten | 186.2 cm (73.3 in) (Bonten), 188.8 cm (74.3 in) (Taishakuten) | Kon-dō, Tōshōdai-ji, Nara, Nara | |
| Yuima (木造維摩居士坐像, mokuzō yuima koji zazō) | Carved by Jōkei over a period of 56 days and painted by Kōen in 50 days | Kamakura period, 1196 | Colored wood in assembled wood-block (yosegi) technique, crystal eyes | Seated Yuima | 88.6 cm (34.9 in) | Eastern Golden Hall (東金堂,, tōkon-dō), Kōfuku-ji, Nara, Nara | Frontal view of a cross-legged seated statue placed on a throne. His right arm rests on his leg, the left arm is bent and slightly raised. |
| Kannon (木造観音菩薩立像, mokuzō kannon bosatsu ryūzō) or Nine-faced Kannon (九面観音, kumen kannon) | One of four national treasure standing Kannon Bosatsu statues at Hōryū-ji. Two more are also in the Great Treasure Gallery (大宝蔵院, daihōzō-in), while the third Kannon Bosatsu is enshrined in the Hall of Dreams (夢殿, yumedono). | Tang dynasty, 7th century | Sandalwood, natural wood surface (素地, kiji) | Standing Kannon | 37.6 cm (14.8 in) | Great Treasure Gallery (大宝蔵院, daihōzō-in), Hōryū-ji, Ikaruga, Nara | Front and profile view of a standing statue with her left arm bend forward. On the head there are small heads visible facing in various directions. |
| Kannon (木造観世音菩薩立像, mokuzō kanzeon bosatsu ryūzō) or Kudara Kannon (百済観音) | One of four national treasure standing Kannon Bosatsu statues at Hōryū-ji. Two more are also in the Great Treasure Gallery (大宝蔵院, daihōzō-in), while the third Kannon Bosatsu is enshrined in the Hall of Dreams (夢殿, yumedono). It has been conjectured to be a work of Korean artisans. | Asuka period, mid 7th century | Colored wood | Standing Kannon | 209.4 cm (82.4 in) | Great Treasure Gallery (大宝蔵院, daihōzō-in), Hōryū-ji, Ikaruga, Nara | Three-quarter view of a very slim and tall statue carrying a vase in with two fingers of her left hand. Her right arm is bent with the palm of her right hand facing upward. A halo on a pole is seen behind the statue. |
| Kannon (木造観世音菩薩立像, mokuzō kanzeon bosatsu ryūzō) or Guze Kannon (救世観音) | Oldest extant wooden statue in Japan. One of four national treasure standing Kannon Bosatsu statues at Hōryū-ji. The others are located in the Great Treasure Gallery (大宝蔵院, daihōzō-in). | Asuka period, ca. 620 | Single block of camphor wood, stitched gold foil (箔押, hakuoshi) | Standing Kannon | 178.8 cm (70.4 in) | Hall of Dreams (夢殿, yumedono), Hōryū-ji, Ikaruga, Nara | Front view of a standing statue with flowing robes holding a small container in front of her body. There is a large halo behind the head of the statue. |
| Tamayorihime (木造玉依姫命坐像, mokuzō tamayorihime no mikoto zazō) | Probably by a Kei school sculptor | Kamakura period, 1251 | Wood, yosegi-zukuri (寄木造) technique, crystal eyes | Seated Tamayorihime | 83 cm (33 in) | Yoshino Mikumari Shrine, Yoshino, Nara | Head and shoulder portrait of a female statue with long hair, painted eyebrows, colored lips and cloths. |
| Kongōrikishi (Niō) (木造金剛力士立像, mokuzō kongōrikishi ryūzō) | — | Kamakura period, 1288 | Colored wood, crystal eyes | Standing pair of Niō: Agyō (阿形) and Ungyō (吽形) | 154.0 cm (60.6 in) (Agyō) and 153.7 cm (60.5 in) (Ungyō) | National Treasure House (国宝館, kokuhōkan), Kōfuku-ji, Nara, Nara | |
| Kongōrikishi (Niō) (木造金剛力士立像, mokuzō kongōrikishi ryūzō) | By Kaikei and Unkei. There is another pair of Kongōrikishi (national treasure) in hokkedō (法華堂), Tōdai-ji. | Kamakura period, 1203 | Colored wood | Standing pair of Niō: Agyō (阿形) and Ungyō (吽形) | 836.3 cm (329.3 in) (Agyō) and 842.3 cm (331.6 in) (Ungyō) | Nandaimon (南大門), Tōdai-ji, Nara, Nara | Agyō. Front view of a scary statue carrying a spear like object in his right hand and the palm of his left hand facing the viewer with fingers spread. Sculpted breastplate and necklace are visible. Ungyō. Front view of a scary statue with the right arm raised and carrying a weapon in his lowered left arm. Sculpted breastplate and necklace are visible. |
| Four Heavenly Kings (木造四天王立像（金堂安置）, mokuzō shitennō ryūzō) | By Yamaguchi no Ōguchi atai (山口大口費) et al. | Asuka period, ca. 650 | Colored wood and cut-gold foil (kirikane (截金)) on wood | Standing Four Heavenly Kings | 133.3 cm (52.5 in) (Jikoku-ten), 134.8 cm (53.1 in) (Zōjō-ten), 133.3 cm (52.5 in) (Kōmoku-ten), 134.2 cm (52.8 in) (Tamon-ten) | Kon-dō, Hōryū-ji, Ikaruga, Nara | |
| Four Heavenly Kings (木造四天王立像（金堂安置）, mokuzō shitennō ryūzō) | — | Nara period, second half of 8th century | Colored wood | Standing Four Heavenly Kings | 185.0 cm (72.8 in) (Jikoku-ten), 187.2 cm (73.7 in) (Zōjō-ten), 186.3 cm (73.3 in) (Kōmoku-ten), 188.5 cm (74.2 in) (Tamon-ten) | Kon-dō, Tōshōdai-ji, Nara, Nara | |
| Four Heavenly Kings (木造四天王立像, mokuzō shitennō ryūzō) | Produced for the South Octagonal Hall, this group has long been placed in the Central Golden Hall (中金堂). There are four sets of Four Heavenly Kings designated as national treasure at Kōfuku-ji. | Kamakura period | Colored wood and cut-gold foil (kirikane (截金)) on wood | Standing Four Heavenly Kings | 204.0 cm (80.3 in) (Jikoku-ten), 202.2 cm (79.6 in) (Zōjō-ten), 204.5 cm (80.5 in) (Kōmoku-ten), 198.0 cm (78.0 in) (Tamon-ten) | South Octagonal Hall (南円堂, nanendō), Kōfuku-ji, Nara, Nara | — |
| Four Heavenly Kings (木造四天王立像, mokuzō shitennō ryūzō) | There are four sets of Four Heavenly Kings designated as national treasure at Kōfuku-ji. | Heian period, early 9th century | Colored wood in single-block (ichiboku) technique and cut-gold foil (kirikane (截金)) on wood | Standing Four Heavenly Kings | 162.5 cm (64.0 in) (Jikoku-ten), 161.0 cm (63.4 in) (Zōjō-ten), 164.0 cm (64.6 in) (Kōmoku-ten), 153.0 cm (60.2 in) (Tamon-ten) | Eastern Golden Hall (東金堂,, tōkon-dō), Kōfuku-ji, Nara, Nara | |
| Four Heavenly Kings (pr, mokuzō shitennō ryūzō) | Attributed to Kōkei. There are four sets of Four Heavenly Kings designated as national treasure at Kōfuku-ji. | Kamakura period, 1189 | Colored wood | Standing Four Heavenly Kings | 206.6 cm (81.3 in) (Jikoku-ten), 197.5 cm (77.8 in) (Zōjō-ten), 200.0 cm (78.7 in) (Kōmoku-ten), 197.2 cm (77.6 in) (Tamon-ten) | South Octagonal Hall (南円堂, nanendō), Kōfuku-ji, Nara, Nara | |
| Shakyamuni (Shaka Nyorai) and two attendants (木造釈迦如来及両脇侍坐像, mokuzō shaka nyorai oyobi ryōwakiji zazō) | — | Heian period, 925–931 | Cherry wood, single tree, gold leaf over lacquer (shippaku (漆箔)) | Seated Shaka Nyorai and two seated attendants. | 227.9 cm (89.7 in) (Shaka), 155.7 cm (61.3 in) (left att.), 153.9 cm (60.6 in) (right att.) | Inner Sanctuary (上御堂, Kami no mi-dō), Hōryū-ji, Ikaruga, Nara | |
| Shakyamuni (Shaka Nyorai) (木造釈迦如来坐像, mokuzō shaka nyorai zazō) | — | Heian period, end of 8th century | Colored wood | Seated Shaka Nyorai | 105.7 cm (41.6 in) | Miroku Hall (弥勒堂, miroku-dō), Murō-ji, Uda, Nara | |
| Shakyamuni (Shaka Nyorai) (木造釈迦如来立像, mokuzō shaka nyorai ryūzō) | — | Heian period, end of 9th century | Colored wood | Standing Shaka Nyorai | 237.7 cm (93.6 in) | Kon-dō, Murō-ji, Uda, Nara | |
| Eleven-faced Goddess of Mercy (木造十一面観音立像, mokuzō jūichimenkannon ryūzō) | — | Heian period, end of 9th century | Colored wood | Standing Jūichimen Kannon | 195.1 cm (76.8 in) | Kon-dō, Murō-ji, Uda, Nara | |
| Eleven-faced Goddess of Mercy (木造十一面観音立像, mokuzō jūichimenkannon ryūzō) | — | Heian period, first half of 9th century | Wood, natural wood surface (素地, kiji) | Standing Jūichimen Kannon | 100.0 cm (39.4 in) | Hon-dō, Hokke-ji, Nara, Nara | Frontal view of the head of a sculpture of a deity. A number of small heads and small statues are placed on top of the head. |
| Yuima (木造維摩居士坐像, mokuzō yuima koji zazō) | Originally considered a work in the dry lacquer (乾漆, kanshitsu) technique, but reassessed as wood carving after X-ray investigation. | Nara period, second half of 8th century | Colored wood | Seated Yuima | 90.8 cm (35.7 in) | Hokke-ji, Nara, Nara | Crosslegged seated statue with arms slightly raised. |
| Twelve Heavenly Generals (木造十二神将立像, mokuzō jūni shinshō ryūzō) | Supposedly each of the statues was carved by a different sculptor | Kamakura period, 1207 | Colored wood and cut-gold foil (kirikane (截金)) on wood | Standing Twelve Heavenly Generals | 113.0–126.4 cm (44.5–49.8 in) | Eastern Golden Hall (東金堂, tōkon-dō), Kōfuku-ji, Nara, Nara | Three-quarter view of a standing statue. The right arm is bent with the right hand in front of the breast. The left arm is also bent with the palm of the left hand pointing upward. |
| Priest Shunjō (木造俊乗上人坐像, mokuzō shunjō shōnin zazō) | Allegedly attributed to either Unkei or Kaikei | Kamakura period, c. 1206 | Colored hinoki wood | Seated priest Chōgen | 81.4 cm (32.0 in) | Shunjō-dō (俊乗堂), Tōdai-ji, Nara, Nara | |
| Prince Shōtoku and four attendants (木造聖徳太子坐像, mokuzō shōtoku taishi zazō) | — | Heian period, 1121 | Colored wood and cut-gold foil (kirikane (截金)) on wood | Seated Prince Shōtoku flanked by four seated figures: younger brother Eguri (山背), first son Yamashiro (殖栗), priest Eji and Somaro (卒末呂) | 84.2 cm (33.1 in) (Shōtoku), 53.9 cm (21.2 in) (Eguri), 63.9 cm (25.2 in) (Yamashiro), 63.9 cm (25.2 in) (Eji), 52.4 cm (20.6 in) (Somaro) | Shōryō-in (聖霊院), Hōryū-ji, Ikaruga, Nara | |
| Thousand-armed Kannon (木造千手観音立像, mokuzō senjū kannon ryūzō) | By a sculptor of the Keiha (慶派) school. Formerly the principal image of the Refectory (食堂, jiki-dō) | Kamakura period, ca. 1220 | Hinoki wood, gold leaf over lacquer (shippaku (漆箔)), crystal eyes | Standing Thousand-armed Kannon | 520.5 cm (204.9 in) | National Treasure House (国宝館, kokuhōkan), Kōfuku-ji, Nara, Nara | — |
| Hachiman in the guise of a seated monk (木造僧形八幡神坐像, mokuzō sōgyō hachimanjin zazō) | By Kaikei | Kamakura period, 1201 | Colored hinoki wood | Seated Hachiman | 87.1 cm (34.3 in) | Hachiman-dono (八幡殿), Tōdai-ji, Nara, Nara | |
| Dainichi Nyorai (木造大日如来坐像, mokuzō dainichi nyorai zazō) | By Unkei. | Heian period, 1176 | Wood, gold leaf over lacquer (shippaku (漆箔)), crystal eyes | Seated Dainichi Nyorai | 98.8 cm (38.9 in) | Tahōtō, Enjō-ji, Nara, Nara | |
| Jizō Bosatsu (木造地蔵菩薩立像, mokuzō jizō bosatsu ryūzō) | — | Heian period, 9th century | Wood | Standing Jizō Bosatsu | 172.7 cm (68.0 in) | Great Treasure Gallery (大宝蔵院, daihōzō-in), Hōryū-ji, Ikaruga, Nara | |
| Bishamonten (木造毘沙門天立像（金堂安置）, mokuzō bishamonten ryūzō) and Kichijōten (木造吉祥天立像（金堂安置）, mokuzō kichijōten ryūzō) | — | Heian period, 1078 | Colored wood and cut-gold foil (kirikane (截金)) on wood | Standing Jizō Bosatsu | 123.2 cm (48.5 in) (Bishamonten), 116.7 cm (45.9 in) (Kichijōten) | Kon-dō, Hōryū-ji, Ikaruga, Nara | |
| Fukū Kensaku Kannon (木造不空羂索観音立像, mokuzō fukū kensaku kannon ryūzō) | By Kōkei | Kamakura period, 1189 | Wood, gold leaf over lacquer (shippaku (漆箔)) | Seated Fukū Kensaku Kannon | 341.5 cm (134.4 in) | South Octagonal Hall (南円堂, nan'endō), Kōfuku-ji, Nara, Nara | |
| Monju Bosatsu (木造文殊菩薩坐像, mokuzō monju bosatsu zazō) | A work of a sculptor of the Kokei school | Kamakura period, 1196 | Colored hinoki wood in assembled wood-block (yosegi) technique, gold paint, crystal eyes | Seated Monju Bosatsu | 93.9 cm (37.0 in) | Eastern Golden Hall (東金堂, tōkon-dō), Kōfuku-ji, Nara, Nara | Three-quarter view of cross-legged seated statue placed on a throne. Both arms rest on his legs. The hair is sculpted with a top knot, which supports a sacred casket. |
| Bodhisattva in half-lotus position (木造菩薩半跏像, mokuzō bosatsu hankazō) or Nyoirin Kannon (如意輪観音) | It had been wrongly venerated as Nyoirin Kannon. | Asuka period, second half of 7th century | Colored Camphorwood | Nyoirin Kannon in half-lotus position | 87.0 cm (34.3 in) | Hon-dō, Chūgū-ji, Ikaruga, Nara | Three-quarter view of a seated statue in half-lotus position. The right foot rests on the left upper leg, the right elbow rests on the right knee with the right hand close to the head. The hair of the statue is sculpted with two top-knots. There is a halo behind the statue's head. |
| Six Patriarchs of the Hossō sect (木造法相六祖坐像, mokuzō hossō rokuso zazō) | By Kōkei | Kamakura period, 1188–1189 | Colored hinoki wood, crystal eyes | Six Patriarchs of the Hossō sect: Jōtō (常騰), Shinei (神叡), Zenshu (善珠), Genbō (玄昉), Genpin (玄賓), Gyōga (行賀) | 73.3 cm (28.9 in) (Jōtō), 81.2 cm (32.0 in) (Shinei), 83.0 cm (32.7 in) (Zenshu), 84.8 cm (33.4 in) (Genbō), 77.2 cm (30.4 in) (Genpin), 74.8 cm (29.4 in) (Gyōga) | South Octagonal Hall (南円堂, nan'endō), Kōfuku-ji, Nara, Nara | Gyōga. Frontal view of a seated monk with the left leg propped up. |
| Miroku Bosatsu (木造弥勒仏坐像, mokuzō miroku butsu zazō) | By Unkei | Kamakura period, 1212 | Wood, gold leaf over lacquer (shippaku (漆箔)) | Seated Miroku Bosatsu | 141.5 cm (55.7 in) | North Octagonal Hall (北円堂, hokuen-dō), Kōfuku-ji, Nara, Nara | |
| Yakushi Nyorai and two attendants (木造薬師如来及両脇侍坐像, mokuzō yakushi nyorai oyobi ryōkyōji zazō) | — | Heian period, end of 10th century | Hinoki wood, single tree, gold leaf over lacquer (shippaku (漆箔)) | Seated Yakushi Nyorai (healing Buddha) and two seated attendants: Nikkō Bosatsu and Gakkō Bosatsu (Bodhisattvas of sun and moon light) | 247.2 cm (97.3 in) (Yakushi), 172.1 cm (67.8 in) (each attendant) | Lecture Hall (講堂, Kō-dō), Hōryū-ji, Ikaruga, Nara | — |
| Yakushi Nyorai (木造薬師如来坐像, mokuzō yakushi nyorai zazō) | — | Heian period, 9th century | Colored Japanese nutmeg wood, single tree | Seated Yakushi Nyorai | 49.7 cm (19.6 in) | Nara National Museum, Nara, Nara | |
| Yakushi Nyorai (木造薬師如来坐像, mokuzō yakushi nyorai zazō) | — | Heian period, end of 8th century | Japanese Nutmeg-yew wood, single tree, natural wood surface (素地, kiji) | Seated Yakushi Nyorai | 191.5 cm (75.4 in) | Hon-dō, Shin-Yakushi-ji, Nara, Nara | |
| Yakushi Nyorai (木造薬師如来立像, mokuzō yakushi nyorai ryūzō) | — | Heian period, early 9th century | Japanese nutmeg wood, single tree, natural wood surface (素地, kiji) | Statue of Yakushi Nyorai | 164.8 cm (64.9 in) | Hon-dō, Gangō-ji, Nara, Nara; deposited at the Nara National Museum | |
| Priest Rōben (木造良弁僧正坐像, mokuzō rōben sōjō zazō) | — | Heian period, end of 9th century | Colored hinoki wood, single tree | Seated Rōben | 92.4 cm (36.4 in) | Founder's Hall (開山堂, kaisan-dō), Tōdai-ji, Nara, Nara | |
| Priest Eison (木造叡尊坐像, mokuzō eison zazō) | By Zenshun. The designation includes items enshrined with Eison. | Kamakura period, 1280 | Wood | Seated Eison | 88.0 cm (34.6 in) | Saidai-ji, Nara, Nara | |
| Hayatama (木造熊野速玉大神坐像, mokuzō kumano hayatama ōkami zazō), Fusumi (木造夫須美大神坐像, mokuzō fusumi ōkami zazō), Ketsumiko (木造家津御子大神坐像, mokuzō ketsumiko ōkami zazō), Kunitokotachi (木造国常立命坐像, mokuzō kunitokotachi no mikoto zazō) | — | early Heian period, 9th century | Colored wood | Four seated Shintō gods: Hayatama, Fusumi, Ketsumiko, Kunitokotachi | 101.2 cm (39.8 in) (Hayatama), 98.5 cm (38.8 in) (Fusumi), 81.2 cm (32.0 in) (Ketsumiko), 80.3 cm (31.6 in) (Kunitokotachi) | Kumano Hayatama Taisha, Shingū, Wakayama | — |
| Miniature Buddhist shrine (木造諸尊仏龕, mokuzō shoson butsugan) | Brought back from China by Kūkai | Tang dynasty, 8th century | Sandalwood, natural wood surface (素地,, kiji) | various Buddhist images | 23.1 cm (9.1 in) | Reihōkan (owned by Kongōbu-ji), Kōya, Wakayama | |
| Thousand-armed Kannon (木造千手観音立像, mokuzō senjū kannon ryūzō) and two Bodhisattvas (木造菩薩立像, mokuzō bosatsu ryūzō) | Unusual combination of deities in this triad | Heian period, second half of 9th century | Wood, single tree, gold leaf over lacquer (shippaku (漆箔)) | Standing Thousand-armed Kannon and two standing Bodhisattvas, believed to be Nikkō Bosatsu and Gakkō Bosatsu (Bodhisattvas of sun and moon light) | 294.2 cm (115.8 in) (Kannon), 241.5 cm (95.1 in) (Nikkō), 242.4 cm (95.4 in) (Gakkō) | Hōbutsuden (宝佛殿), Dōjō-ji, Hidakagawa, Wakayama | |
| Eight Attendants of Fudō Myōō (木造八大童子立像, mokuzō hachidai dōji ryūzō) | Only six of the eight statues date to the Kamakura period and are national treasures. The remaining two (Anokuda (阿耨達), Shitoku (指徳)) were produced in the 14th century and are not included in this nomination. By Unkei. Formerly enshrined in the Fudō-dō (不動堂) | Kamakura period, 1197 | Colored hinoki wood, crystal eyes | Six of the Eight Attendants of Fudō Myōō: Ekō (慧光), Eki (慧喜), Ukubaga (烏倶婆誐), Shōjō Biku (清浄比丘), Kongara (矜羯羅), Seitaka (制多迦) | 96.6 cm (38.0 in) (Ekō), 98.8 cm (38.9 in) (Eki), 95.1 cm (37.4 in) (Ukubaga), 97.1 cm (38.2 in) (Shōjō), 95.6 cm (37.6 in) (Kongara), 103.0 cm (40.6 in) (Seitaka) | Reihōkan (owned by Kongōbu-ji), Kōya, Wakayama | |
| Miroku Bosatsu (木造弥勒仏坐像, mokuzō miroku butsu zazō) | — | Heian period, 892 | Colored hinoki wood, single tree | Seated Miroku Bosatsu | 91.0 cm (35.8 in) | Jison-in, Kudoyama, Wakayama | — |
| Usuki Stone Buddhas (臼杵磨崖仏, Usuki magaibutsu) | Only national treasure sculptures of stone. | late Heian period–early Kamakura period | Colored stone | 59 statues in total in four groups. (i) Furuzono group (古園石仏, furuzono sekibutsu): 13 statues; (ii) Sannō group (山王山石仏, sannōzan sekibutsu): 3 statues; (iii) Hoki group (ホキ石仏, hoki sekibutsu), 1st cave: 25 statues (iv) Hoki group, 2nd cave: 18 statues | 26.8–280.0 cm (10.6–110.2 in) | Usuki, Ōita | Photograph of a row of ca. ten seated stone statues in front of a rock. Three-quarter view. One of the statues is about twice as large as the others. |

== See also ==
- Independent Administrative Institution National Museum
- Japanese sculpture
- Nara Research Institute for Cultural Properties
- Shinjo Ito
- Tokyo Research Institute for Cultural Properties
