= Isshin-ji =

Buddhist temple in Osaka, Japan

Coordinates: 34°39′11″N 135°30′39″E

Isshin-ji 一心寺
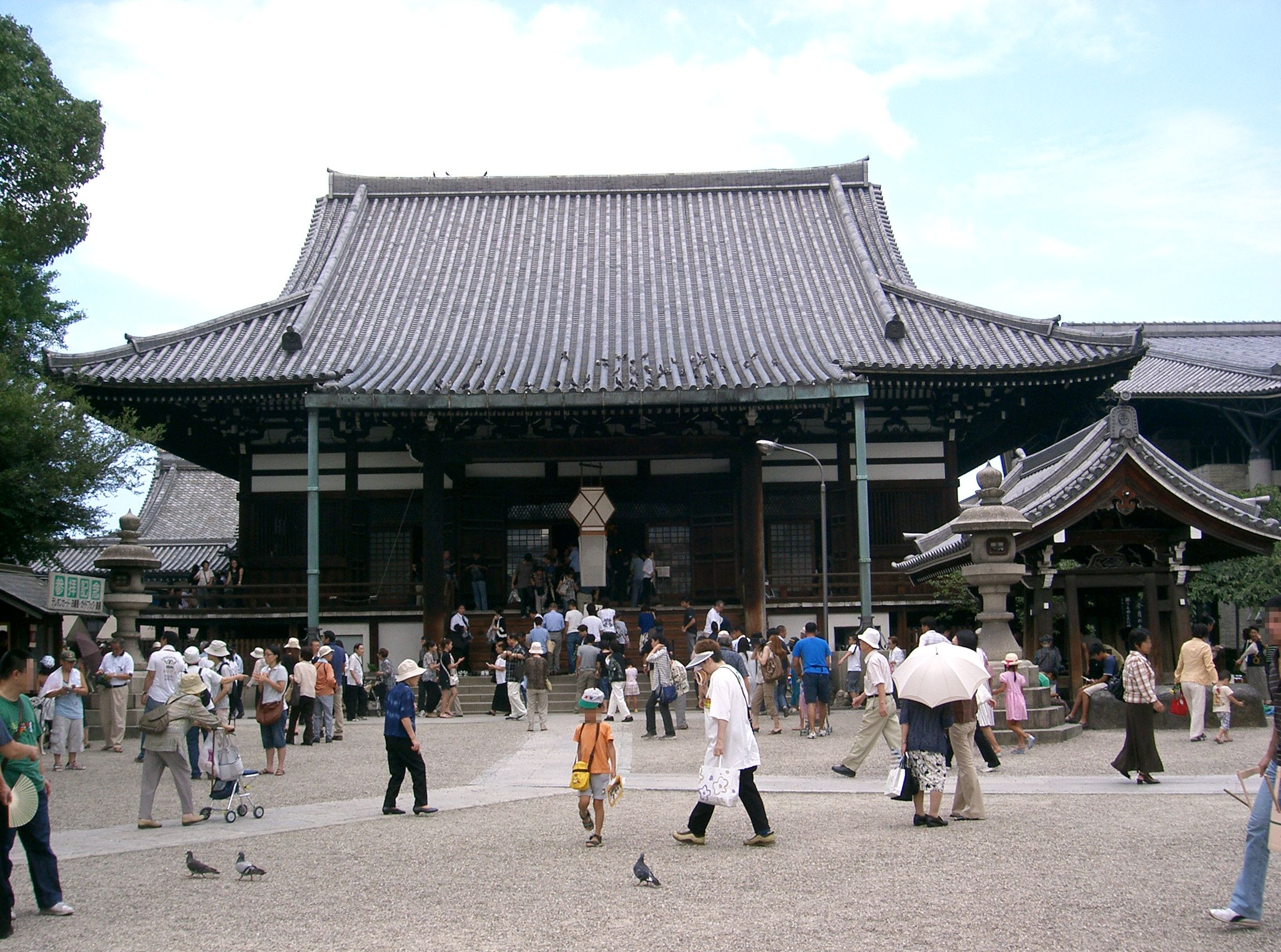
- Hondō (1966)

Religion
- Affiliation: Jōdo-shū

Location
- Location: Tennōji-ku, Osaka
- Country: Japan
- Interactive map of Isshin-ji 一心寺

Architecture
- Founder: Hōnen
- Completed: 1185

Website
- homepage (Jp)

Isshin-ji (一心寺) is a Pure Land Buddhist temple in Osaka, Japan. Starting in the Meiji period, thirteen images have been formed, each incorporating the ashes of tens of thousands of devotees. The annual burial ceremony on 21 April in turn draws tens of thousands of worshippers.

== History ==
Isshin-ji is said to have been founded in 1185 by Hōnen. Tokugawa Ieyasu camped at the compound in 1614–15 during the Siege of Osaka Castle and became a patron of the temple after his victory. Kobori Enshū designed the temple's tea room or chashitsu in this period called Yatsu-mado no seki (八つ窓の席). The popular Kabuki actor Ichikawa Danjūrō VIII was buried in the grounds in 1854 and from that time large numbers of urns were deposited there. By the mid-1880s there were over fifty thousand and, in part due to limitations of space, in 1887 the head priest commissioned sculptors skilled in casting to create a statue of Amida, combining the ashes with resin. Bombing during the Pacific War destroyed the temple and the six statues completed by then.

The Nōkotsudō was the first structure to be rebuilt, in 1957, in order to house the images; this was followed by the Hondō in 1966, Guest Centre (Nissōden) in 1977, and the Nenbutsu dō in 1992. The main gate, with two bronze guardian statues (Kongōrikishi), was added in 1997, and was constructed with steel, reinforced concrete, and glass. The Sanzen Butsudō of 2002, designed to resemble a church, features a large mural of Amida, Kannon, and Seishi appearing to welcome the dying. It is claimed that this painting is the largest tempera mural in the world. The hall is used for services, weddings, and as a theatre for the local experimental troupe.

== Okotsu butsu ==
The phenomenon of okotsu butsu (お骨佛) (lit. 'bone Buddhas') may be traced to a four-metre polychrome statue of Jizō dating to 1700, formed by the priest Shingan (1647–1706) from crushed bones mixed with clay and dedicated at the temple of Daien-ji in Kanazawa, where it still stands. Hōnen-ji (法然寺) in Takamatsu and Shōjōkei'in (清浄華院) in Kyoto have since followed Isshin-ji's example. While the first six sculptures were lost in the war, a further seven have since been formed with collection underway for the fourteenth; all are of Amida:

- No. 7 (1948), from fragments of the first six statues and the ashes of a further 220,000 people
- No. 8 (1957), from the ashes of 160,000 people
- No. 9 (1967), from the ashes of 150,000 people
- No. 10 (1977), from the ashes of 127,619 people
- No. 11 (1987), from the ashes of 145,664 people
- No. 12 (1997), from the ashes of 150,726 people
- No. 13 (2007), from the ashes of 163,254 people

== Other treasures ==
Treasures designated as Municipal Cultural Properties comprise an Edo-period picture scroll of temple legends, eight surviving documents relating to the temple's history, and an early eighteenth-century portrait of a temple priest.

== See also ==
- Pure Land Buddhism
- Japanese funeral
- Japanese sculpture
- Shitennō-ji
