= Kongōbu-ji =

Ecclesiastical head temple of Kōyasan Shingon Buddhism

Coordinates: 34°12′51″N 135°35′03″E

Kongōbu-ji 金剛峰寺
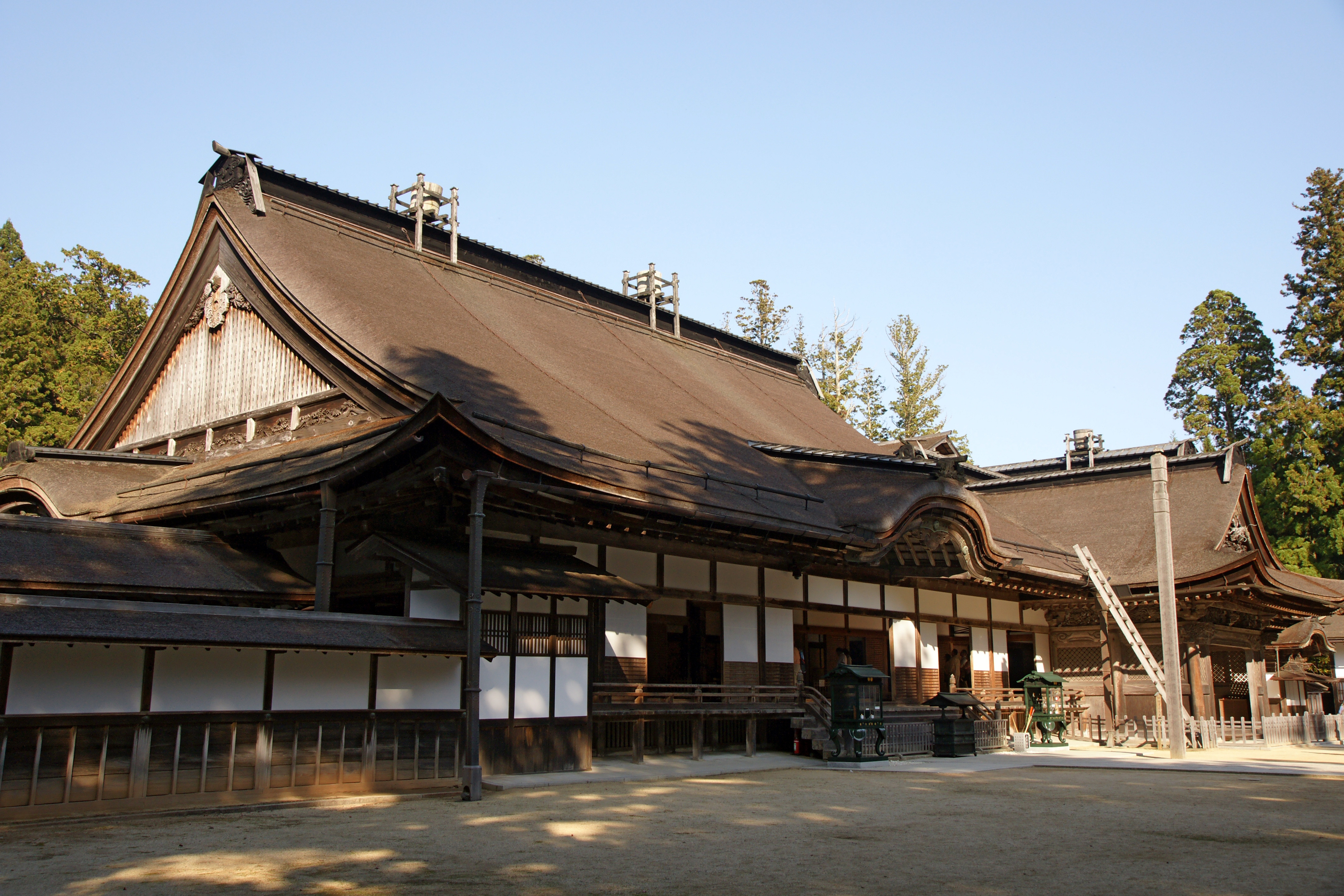

Religion
- Affiliation: Kōyasan School of Shingon Buddhism
- Deity: Ashuku Nyorai (Akṣobhya)

Location
- Location: 132 Kōyasan, Kōya-chō, Ito-gun, Wakayama Prefecture
- Country: Japan
- Interactive map of Kongōbu-ji 金剛峰寺

Architecture
- Founder: Kūkai
- Completed: 816

Website
- https://www.koyasan.or.jp/en/

Kongōbu-ji (金剛峯寺) is the ecclesiastic head temple of Kōyasan Shingon Buddhism, located on Mount Kōya (高野山, Kōya-san), Wakayama Prefecture, Japan. Its name means Vajra Peak Temple. It is part of the "Sacred Sites and Pilgrimage Routes in the Kii Mountain Range" UNESCO World Heritage Site.

The temple was first constructed as Seigan-ji Temple in 1593 by Toyotomi Hideyoshi on the death of his mother, rebuilt in 1861, and given its present name in 1869. It contains many sliding screen doors painted by Kanō Tanyū (1602-1674) and members of the Kyoto Kanō school.

The temple's modern Banryūtei (蟠龍庭 rock garden) is Japan's largest (2340 square meters), with 140 granite stones arranged to suggest a pair of dragons emerging from clouds to protect the temple.

The 414th abbot of Kongōbu-ji is the Reverend Kogi Kasai, who also acts as the archbishop of the Kōyasan Shingon school.

At the temple, visitors can listen to the sermons of the monks and participate in ajikan meditation sessions. The term ajikan refers to a fundamental breathing and meditation method of Shingon Buddhism: "meditating on the letter A" written using the Siddhaṃ alphabet.

== Gallery ==
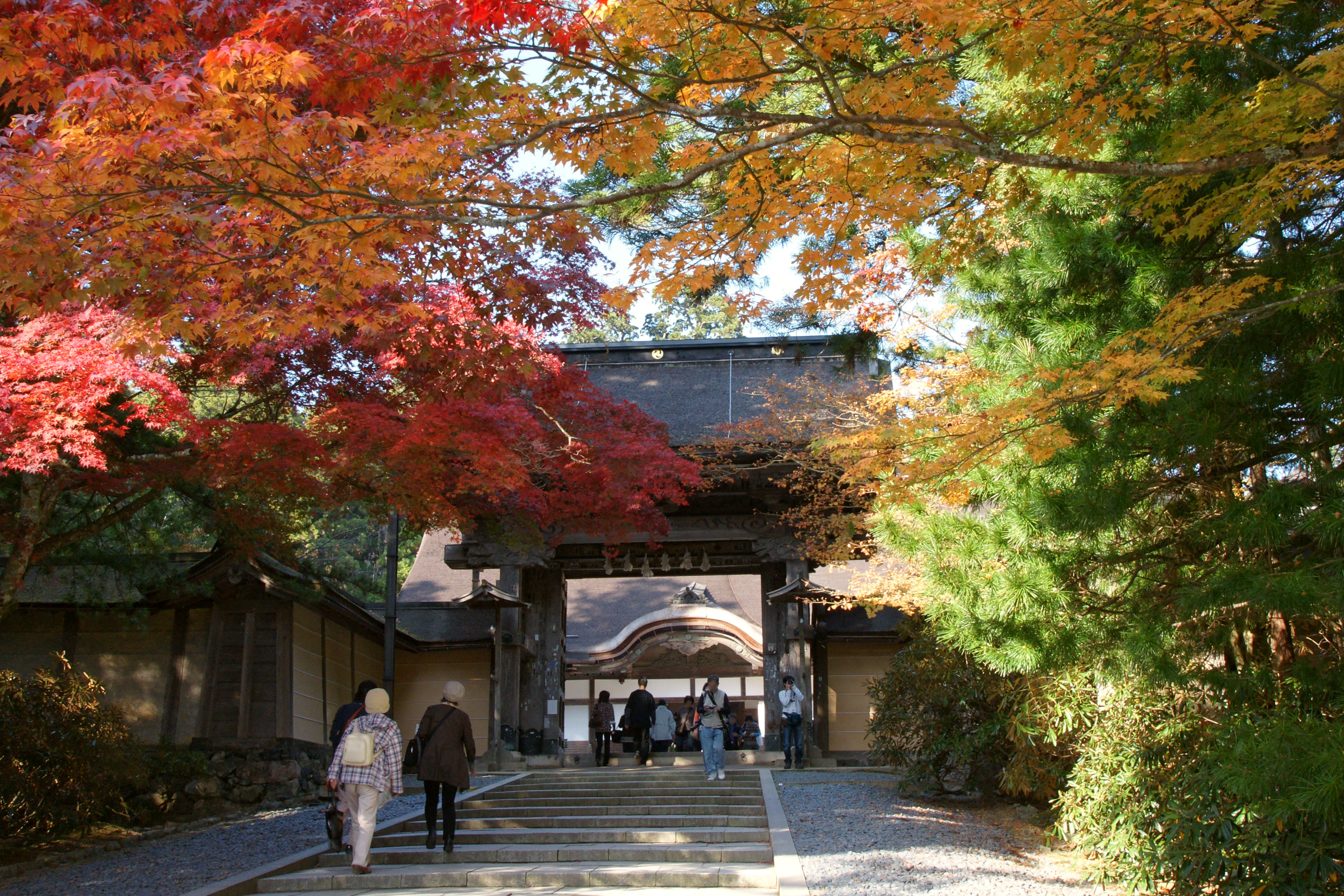
Approach

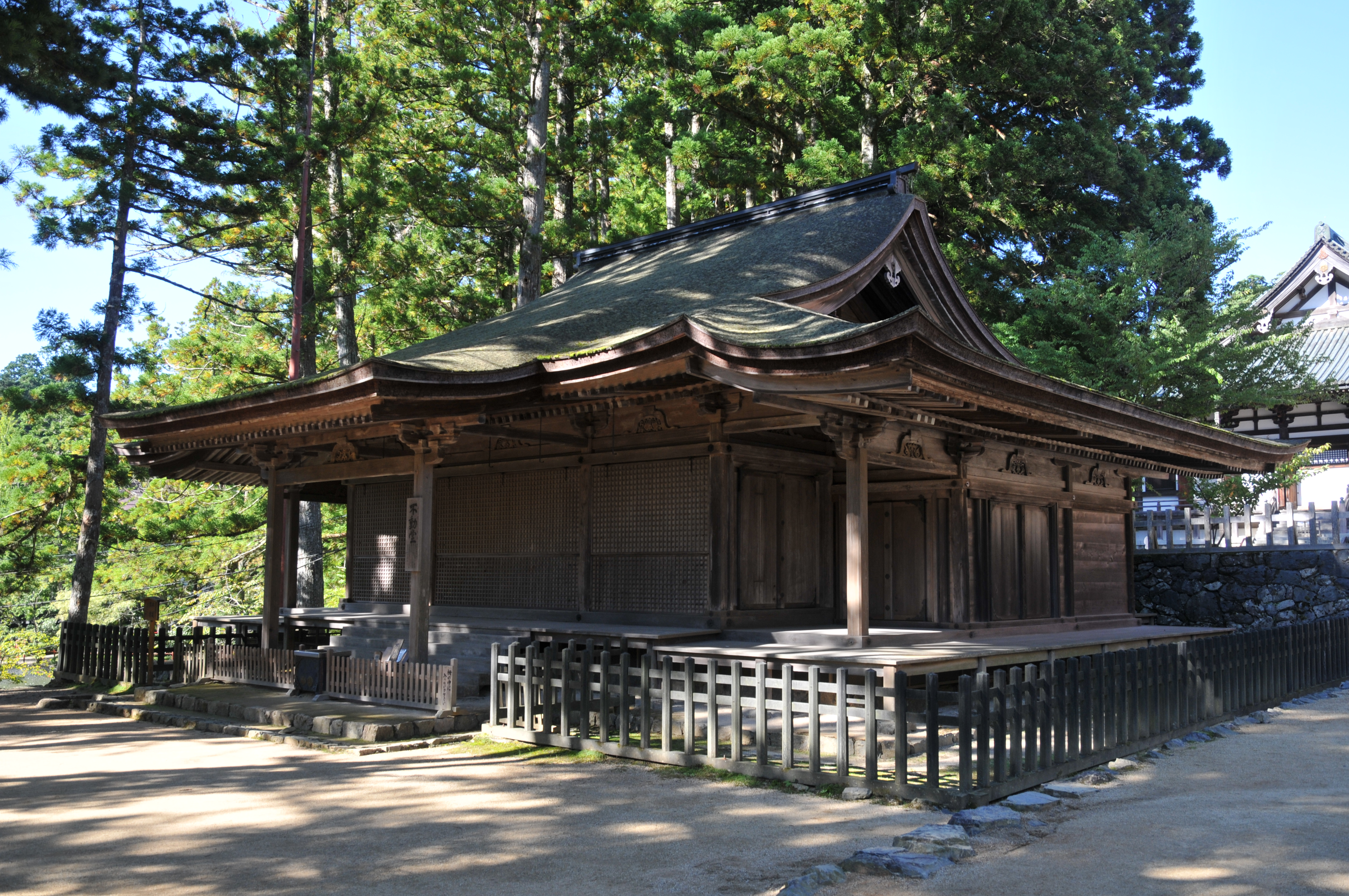
Fudōdō,
a National Treasure

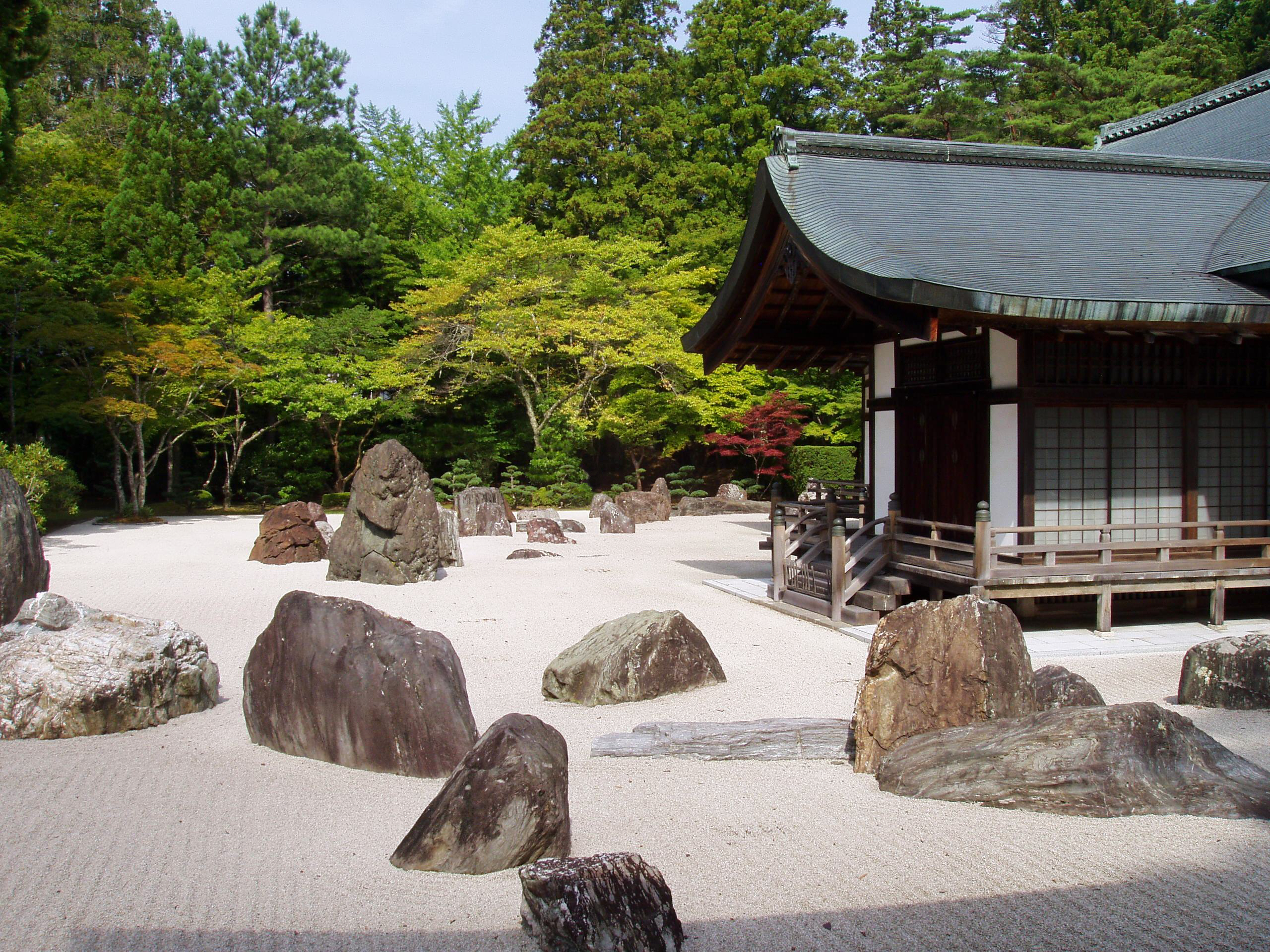
Banryūtei rock garden

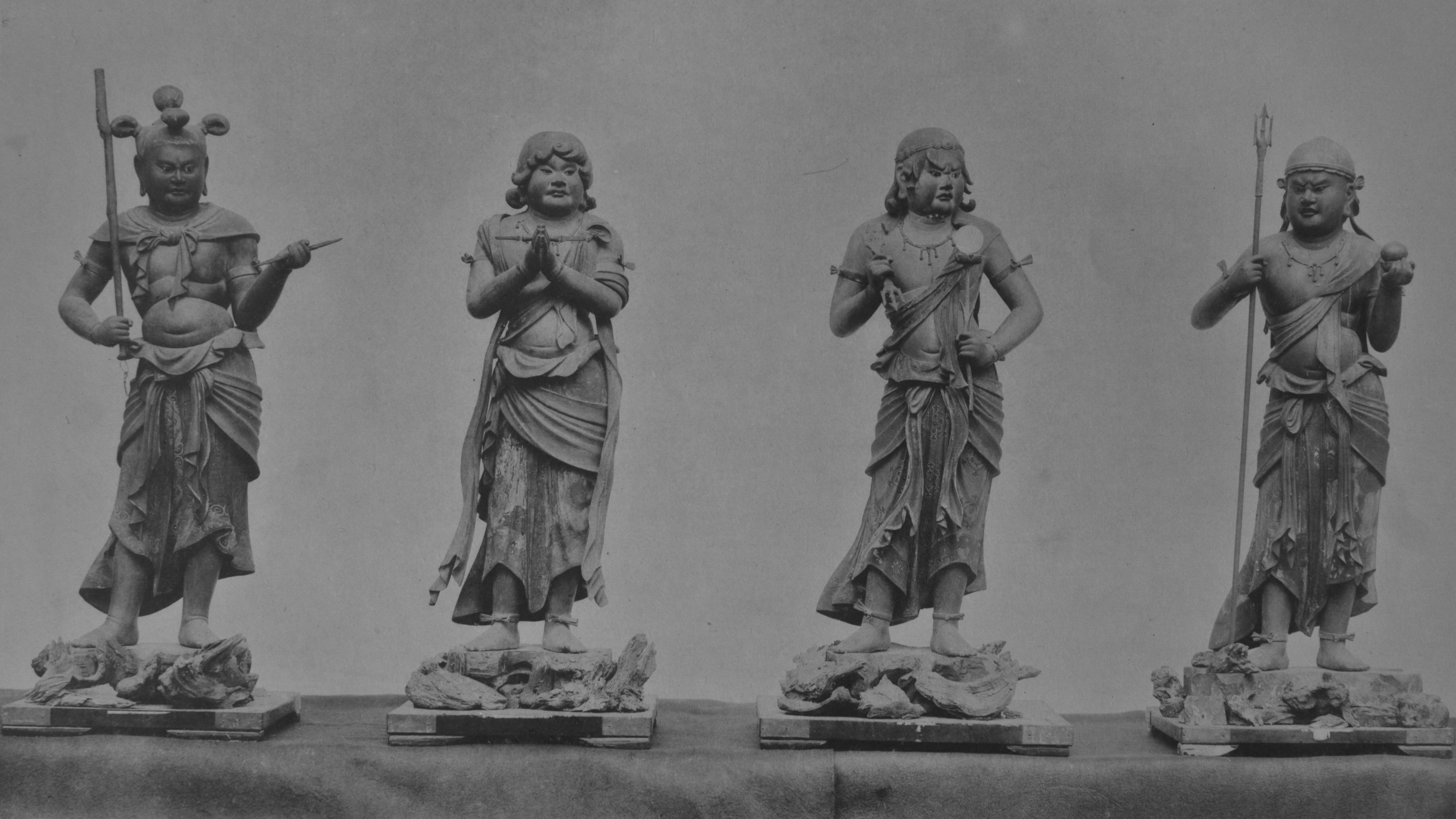
Eight Attendants

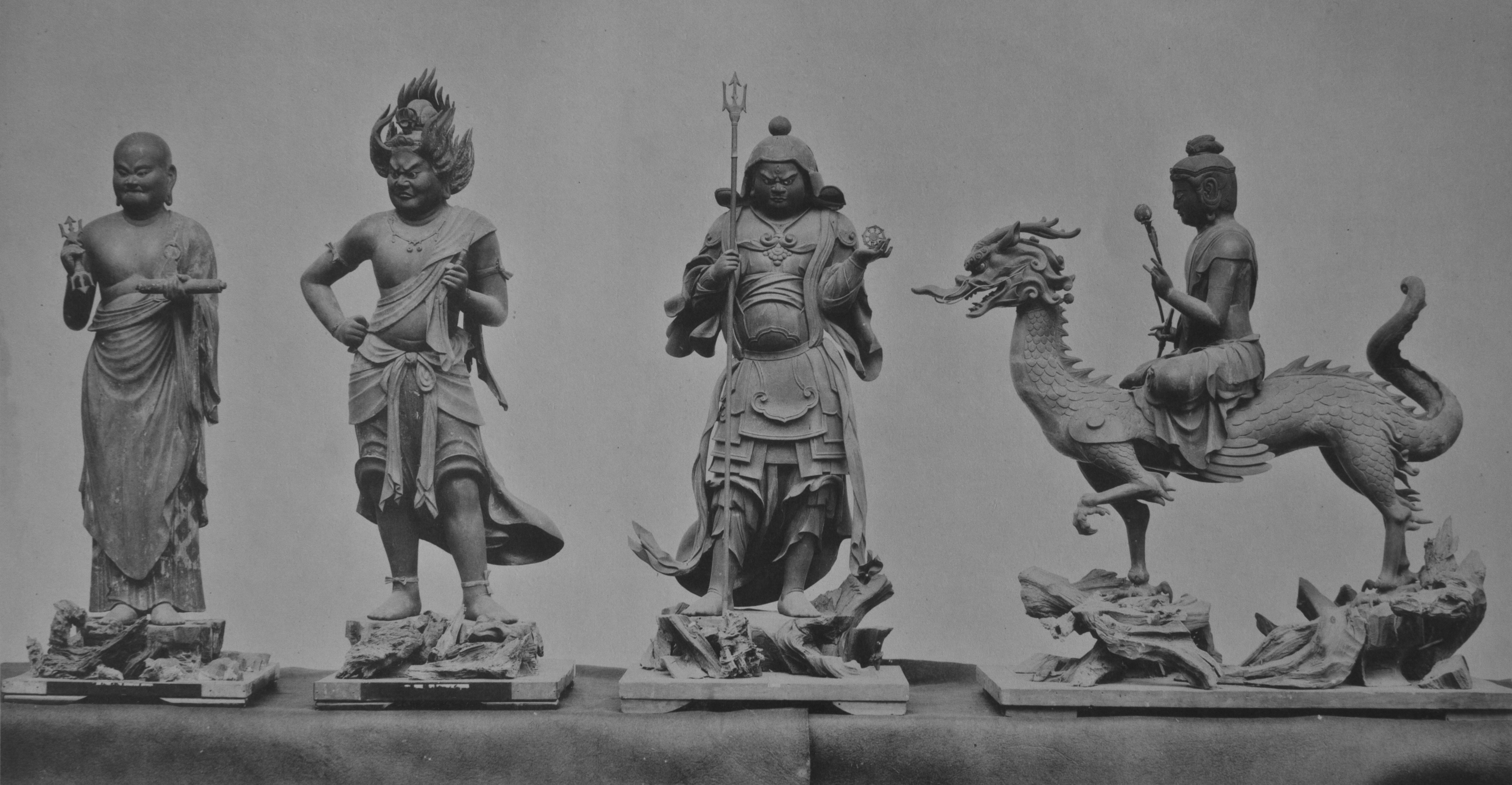
Eight Attendants

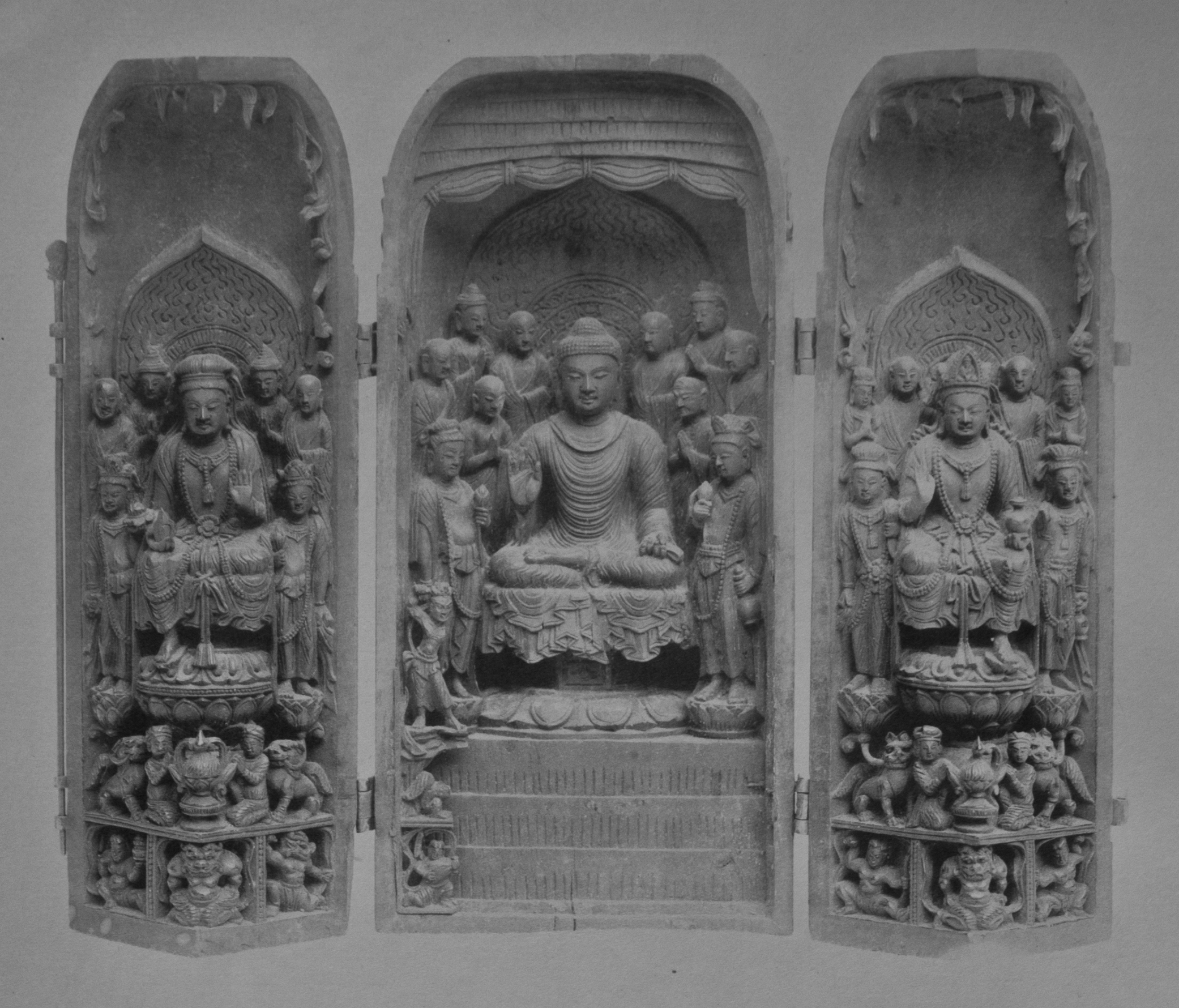
Buddha with attendants

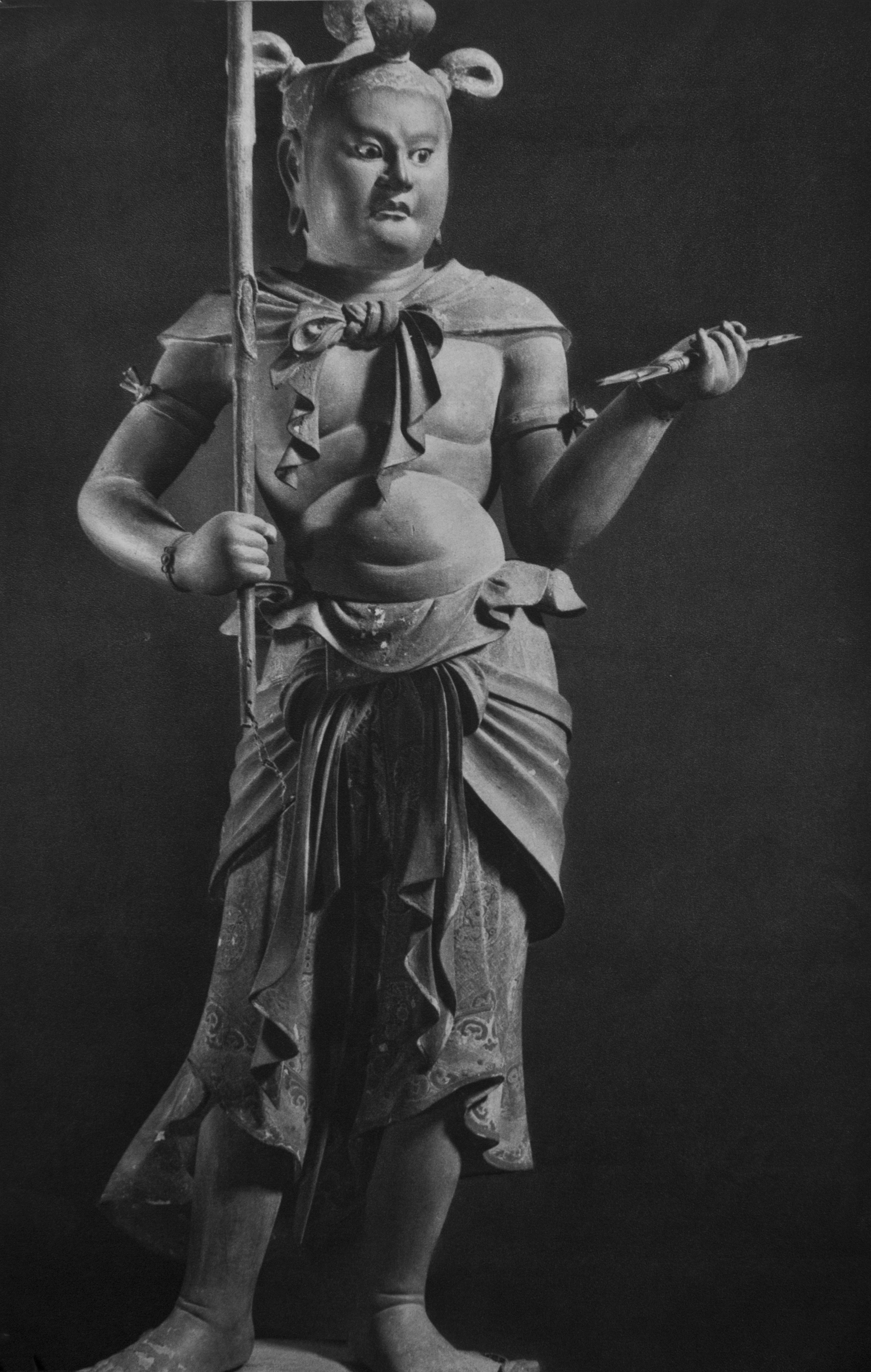
Seitaka Doji

== See also ==
- List of National Treasures of Japan (temples)
- List of National Treasures of Japan (ancient documents)
- List of National Treasures of Japan (paintings)
- List of National Treasures of Japan (sculptures)
- List of National Treasures of Japan (writings)
- List of National Treasures of Japan (crafts-others)
- Tourism in Japan
