= Sanzen-in =

Buddhist temple in Kyoto Prefecture, Japan

Coordinates: 35°07′11″N 135°50′04″E

Sanzen-in (三千院)
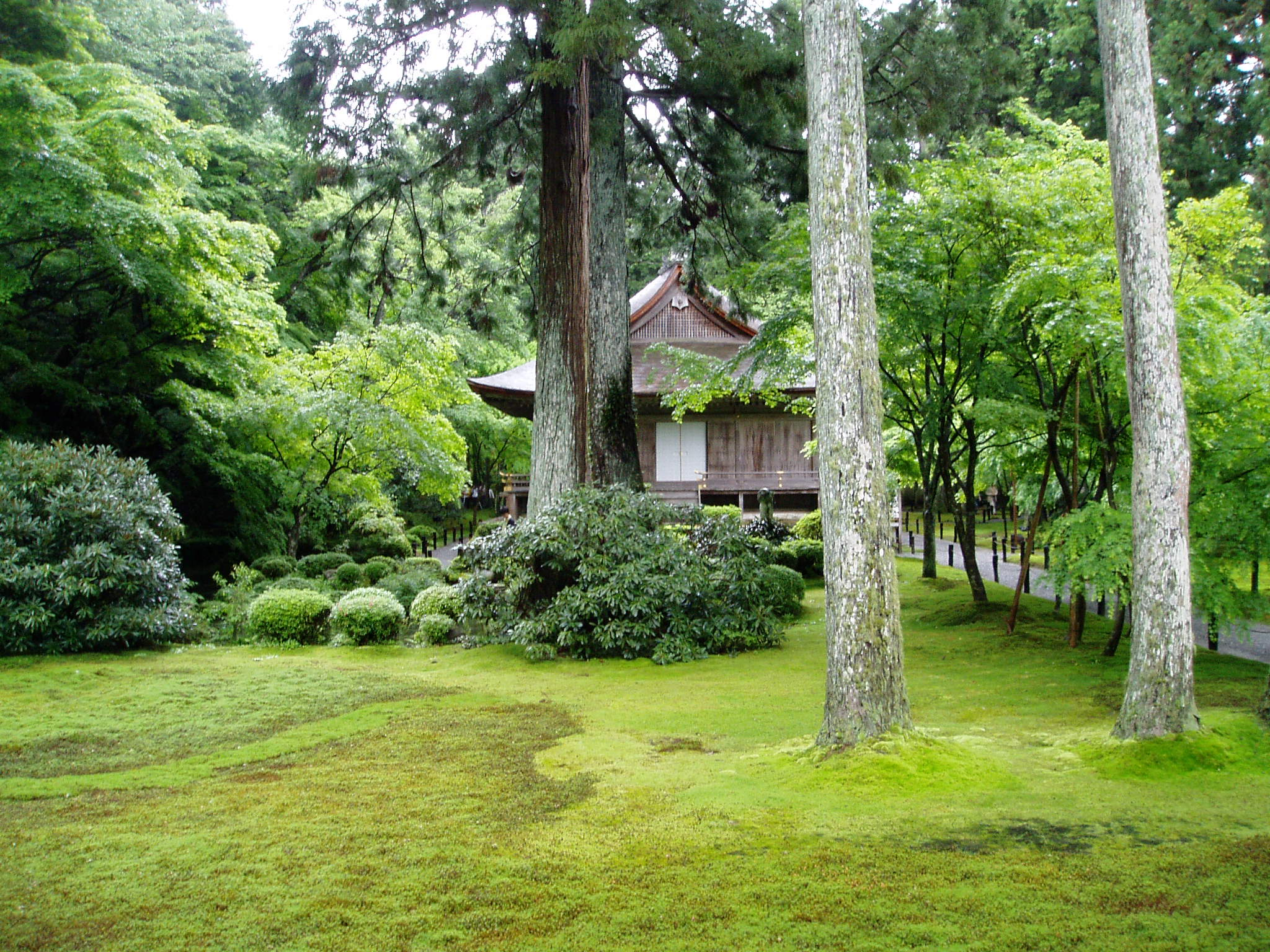
- Ōjō Gokuraku-in Amidadō in Sanzen-in, an Important Cultural Property

Religion
- Affiliation: Tendai

Location
- Location: Ōhara, Kyoto
- Country: Japan
- Interactive map of Sanzen-in (三千院)

Architecture
- Completed: 804

Sanzen-in (三千院) is a Tendai school monzeki temple in Ōhara, Kyoto, Japan. The Heian period triad of Amida Nyorai flanked by attendants is a National Treasure.

Sanzenin Temple is the main attraction of the rural town of Ohara, which is located about an hour north of central Kyoto. The approach from Ohara bus stop to Sanzenin is lined with shops and restaurants catering to temple visitors, and there are a number of smaller temples in the vicinity. Sanzenin Temple itself has large temple grounds and a variety of buildings, gardens and walking paths.

Sanzenin was founded by the monk Saicho who introduced Tendai Buddhism to Japan in 804. Sanzenin is a monzeki temple, one of only a few temples whose head priests used to be members of the imperial family.

After entering the temple through the front gate, visitors to Sanzenin pass through a series of connected temple buildings. The first major building is the Kyakuden (guest hall), which displays works of Japanese calligraphy and paintings on sliding doors (fusuma). The building opens up onto the Shuhekien Garden, a traditional Japanese garden that has a small pond and hill.

Connected to the Kyakuden by a corridor, the Shinden (main hall) displays statues of three Buddhist deities, the central figure of Amida Buddha being flanked by the attendants Kannon and Fudo Myoo. From the Shinden visitors can enjoy the most famous view of Sanzenin Temple: the Ojo Gokuraku-in Hall seen through maple and cedar trees across a moss garden.

After admiring the view from the Shinden, visitors walk through the moss garden. A tranquil atmosphere permeates the garden, and there are a number of amusing stone statues that peek out from the moss. Along with the rest of the temple, the garden is particularly impressive during the autumn colors, which usually take place in mid November, about a week earlier than in central Kyoto.

Located in the middle of the moss garden, the Ojo Gokuraku-in Hall is the oldest temple building at Sanzenin. The hall was first built in 985 and most recently rebuilt in 1143. It holds a statue of Amida Buddha, Sanzenin's most valued treasure. The statue of Amida is accompanied by two attendant deities, Kannon on one side and Seishi on the other.

From the Ojo Gokuraku-in Hall there is a path that leads to the back of the temple grounds, where there are a few temple buildings of more recent construction. One interesting spot has rows of miniature statues of Kannon that were donated to the temple by visitors. On the way back to the front gate stands a treasure house that displays a few more of Sanzenin's artifacts.

== See also ==
- List of National Treasures of Japan (sculptures)
