= Tentōki and Ryūtōki =

Supernatural demon-like characters in Japanese folklore

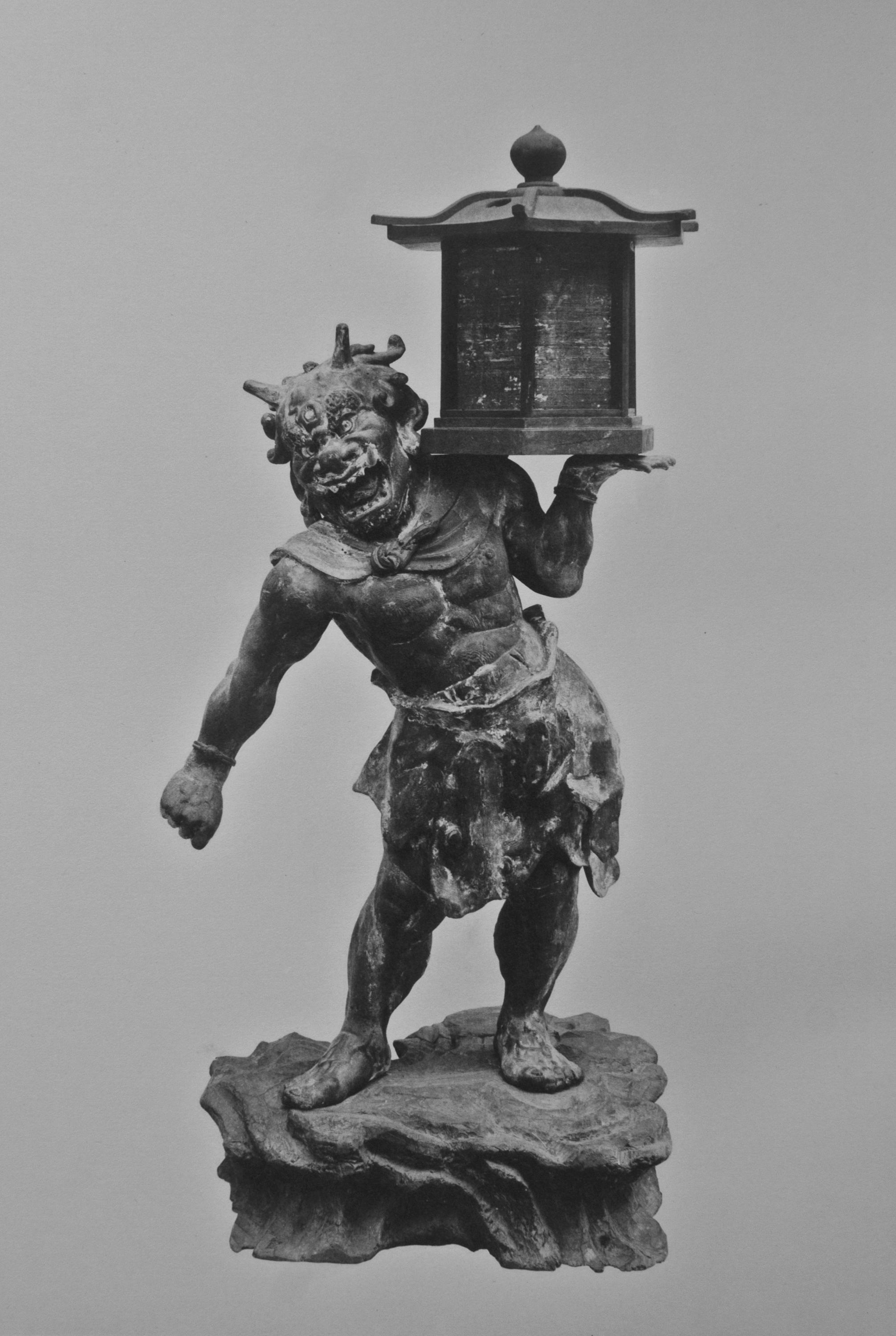
Tentoki statue in Kofukuji, Nara National Museum, Japan

Tentōki and Ryūtōki (木造天燈鬼立像 mokuzō tentōki ritsuzō) and (木造竜燈鬼立像 mokuzō ryūtōki ritsuzō) are a pair of demon-like creatures in Japanese folklore. They are usually depicted as small oni, and symbolize the power of the Shitennō to repel and defeat evil.

Kōben sculpted notable statues of Tentōki and Ryūtōki, each considered a National Treasure of Japan, carrying lanterns as offering to the Historical Buddha at Kōfuku-ji in Nara.

== See also ==
- Japanese mythology in popular culture
