= Standing Bishamonten =

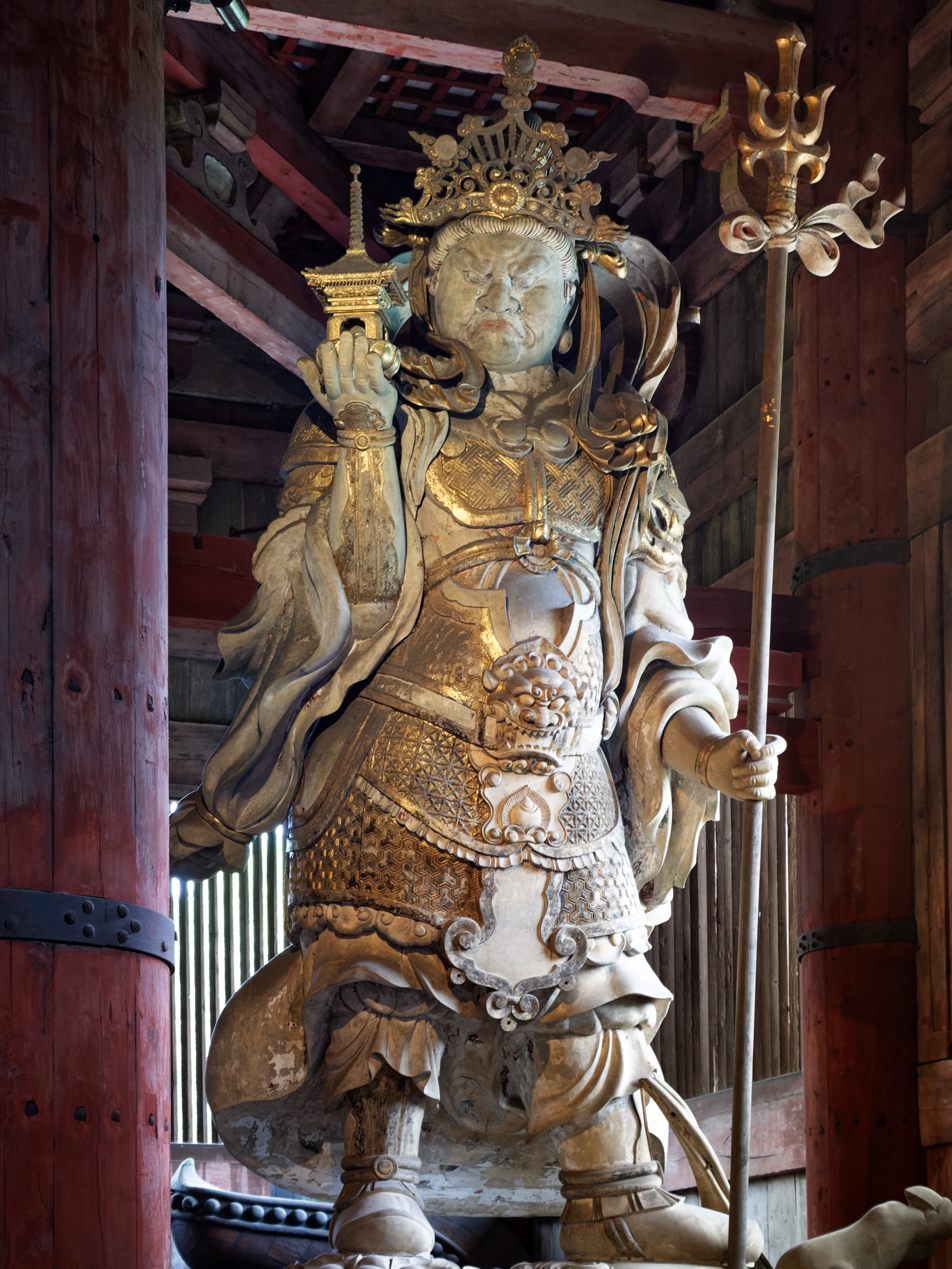
Bishamonten statue at Todai-ji temple in Nara

Standing Bishamonten of Tōdai-ji is one of the guardians of a Buddhist temple called Tōdai-ji, or Tadaiji, in Nara, Japan. This statue is from the Kamakura Period, in the first half of the thirteenth century. The original artist is unknown, because the statue was not signed. It stands about 4.2 m (170 in) tall and is made of cypress wood. It is a painted wood statue and is inlaid with crystals.

== Description ==
The statue is male and is of the god Bishamon. This god is standing on a demon that looks like a small lion. He is wearing shoes, shin guards, armored pants, and chest armor. He is holding a lance in his left hand, otherwise known as a partisan or spear. He is holding a stuppa in his right hand, otherwise known as a pagoda-shaped shrine or houtou that came to symbolize the treasure house of Buddhist treasures. He is wearing tight armor that reaches past his knees. On each breast is a swirl design with a more geometrical design dividing the breasts (the sternum area). He is wearing a cloak over his armor that hangs all the way to the ground and is very curvilinear. The sleeves of this cloak hang from his elbows, also in a very curvilinear fashion. These curves offset the hard armor that will not give or bend. The way that he stands is also very curvilinear in style. The lines of the cloak and his posture give the deity the appearance of motion, agility, and energy. It even seems that the wind is actually blowing his garment. This is offset by the armor and his proportional size that stands for his physical strength and power. He was created to put fear into demons and human invaders. He also wears a crown or halo of gold that is on fire. His hair is very neatly put up into a bun on the very top of his head. Also he does not have much of a neck, and what neck he does have is covered by his armor. There is an armor plate that covers his belly and then other armored plates that hang over and past his hips. He has a very serious look on his face.

== Sources ==
- Boger, Batterson H. The Traditional Arts of Japan. New York, 1964.
- Buddha Statues & Other Buddhist Art from the Japanese Buddhist Temple, 3/10/09.
- Mason, Penelope. History of Japanese Art. Japan, 1993. ISBN 0-8109-1085-3.
- Paine, Robert and Soper, Alexander. The Art and Architecture of Japan. Harmondsworth: Penguin, 1955
