= Seishi =

- Gender: Male

Origin
- Origin: Japanese
- Meaning: Different meanings depending on the kanji used

Seishi (written: 聖史, 正士, 正史 or 誠志) is a masculine Japanese given name. Notable people with the name include:

- Seishi Kanetsuki (金築 誠志) (born 1945), Japanese jurist
- Seishi Kikuchi (菊池 正士) (1902–1974), Japanese physicist
- Seishi Kishimoto (岸本 聖史) (born 1974), Japanese manga artist
- Seishi Yokomizo (横溝 正史) (1902–1981), Japanese writer
- Seishi (聖師) Onisaburo Deguchi (出口王仁三郎) (1871–1948), Japanese spiritual leader
- Seishi Yamaguchi (山口誓子; November 3, 1901 – March 26, 1994), Japanese haiku writer

== Other uses ==
- The Japanese term for Worship of the living

== See also ==
- Mahasthamaprapta
