= Glossary of Japanese Buddhism =

This is the glossary of Japanese Buddhism, including major terms the casual (or brand-new) reader might find useful in understanding articles on the subject. Words followed by an asterisk (*) are illustrated by an image in one of the photo galleries. Within definitions, words set in boldface are defined elsewhere in the glossary.

== A ==
- agyō* (阿形) – A type of statue (of a **Niō**, **komainu**, etc.) with its mouth open to pronounce the sound "a", first letter of the Sanskrit alphabet and symbol of the beginning of all things. See also ungyō.
- Amida **Nyorai** (阿弥陀如来) – Japanese name of Amitabha, deity worshiped mainly by the Pure Land sect.
- Anjitsu/Anshitsu (庵室, lit. "Hermitage Residence") – A Hermitage.
- arhat – see **arakan**.
- arakan* (阿羅漢) – the highest level of Buddhist ascetic practice, or someone who has reached it. The term is often shortened to just rakan (羅漢).

== B ==
- bay – see **ken**.
- bettō (別当) – Previously the title of the head of powerful temples, e.g. Tōdai-ji, Kōfuku-ji, etc. (still in use at the former). Also a monk who was present at Shinto shrines to perform Buddhist rites until the Meiji period, when the government forbade with the **shinbutsu bunri** policy the mixing of Shinto and Buddhism.
- bodai – from the Pāli and Sanskrit word for way or knowledge.
  - **satori**, or Buddhist enlightenment.
  - Ceremonies and other efforts to ensure someone's happiness in the next world, after death.
- bodaiji – lit. "**bodhi** temple". A temple which, generation after generation, takes care of a family's dead giving them burial and performing ceremonies in their favor. See for example the Tokugawa's Kan'ei-ji.
- Bon (盆) – See Bon Festival
- bosatsu (菩薩)
  - A **bodhisattva**
  - The historical Gautama Buddha, before enlightenment.
  - In Mahayana Buddhism, someone who could enter paradise but chooses not to, to help others achieve enlightenment.
  - Someone who is in pursuit of satori.
  - during the **shinbutsu-shūgō** period, an honorific used for Japanese **kami**, as for example in "Hachiman Bosatsu".
- Buddha – the term Buddha in the upper case can refer to:
  - Shakyamuni Buddha, Indian spiritual and philosophical teacher and founder of Buddhism; Gautama Buddha.
  - one who has become enlightened (i.e., awakened to the truth, or Dharma)
  - Any of the other Buddhas named in Buddhist scriptures.
  - A statue or image of any Buddha.
- buddha – the term 'buddha' in the lower case refers not to Gautama Buddha but to:
  - a statue of Gautama Buddha
  - any of the other buddhas (enlightened ones) named in Buddhist scriptures.
- Buddha's footprints – see bussokuseki
- bussokuseki* (仏足石) – lit. Buddha's foot (print) stone. A stone carved with footprints representing Buddha. Before the instruction of the human figure, Buddha was represented only indirectly through his footprints.
- Butsuden or Butsu-dō* (仏殿・仏堂) – lit. "Hall of Buddha".
  - A **Zen** temple's **main hall**. Seems to have two stories, but has in fact only one and measures either 3x3 or 5x5 bays.
  - Any building enshrining the statue of Buddha or of a **bodhisattva** and dedicated to prayer.
- butsudan* (仏壇) – a tabernacle used in homes to install Buddhist images and tablets recording the posthumous names of deceased family members.
- buppō (仏法) – see **hō**
- buttō (仏塔) – a **stupa** or one of its relatives. See also **tō**, **pagoda**, **gorintō**, **hōkyōintō**, **sotoba**, **sekitō** and **tahōtō**.

== C ==
- chinju (鎮守/鎮主) – the tutelary **kami** or tutelary **shrine** of a certain area or Buddhist temple.
- chinjusha* (鎮守社/鎮主社) – a small **shrine** built at a Buddhist **temple** and dedicated to its tutelary kami.
- chōzuya (手水舎) – see **temizuya**.
- chūmon* (中門) – in a temple, the gate after the **nandaimon** connected to a **kairō**. See also **mon**.

== D ==
- Daihi Kannon (大悲観音) -See **Senju Kannon**.
- Dainichi **Nyorai** (大日如来) – Japanese name of Vairocana, of which the Japanese kami Amaterasu is considered an emanation (see **honji suijaku**).
- danka (檀家) – a family or individual affiliated to a particular temple is called one of its danka. See also **danka system**
- danka system (檀家制度 danka-seido) – a system in which a family (the **danka**) contributes to the support of a particular Buddhist temple, which in return provides its services. This kind of temple affiliation became mandatory during the Edo period, when was used by the shogunate for political ends (see also **terauke**).
- -dō (堂) – Lit. hall. Suffix for the name of the buildings part of a temple. The prefix can be the name of a deity associated with it (e.g. **Yakushi-dō**, or Yakushi hall) or express the building's function within the temple's compound (e.g. **hon-dō**, or main hall). See also **Butsu-dō**, **hō-dō**, **hon-dō**, **jiki-dō**, **kaisan-dō**, **kō-dō**, **kon-dō**, **kyō-dō**, **mandara-dō**, **miei-dō**, **mi-dō**, **sō-dō**, **Yakushi-dō** and **zen-dō**.

== E ==
- Enma*, Emmaten or Emmaō (閻魔, 閻魔天 or 閻魔王) – Japanese transliteration of Yama, the ruler of the underworld in Buddhist mythology.
- enlightenment – see **satori**.

== F ==
- family temple – see **bodaiji**.
- funeral temple – see **bodaiji**.
- Fuju-fuse-gi (不受不施義) – the duty of a Nichiren sect member not to accept anything from, or give anything to a non-believer.
- Five Mountain System – See **Gozan Seido**.

== G ==
- garan – see **shichi-dō garan**.
- gejin (外陣) – the portion of a **hon-dō** (main hall) open to the public, as opposed to the **naijin**, reserved to the deity.
- Gokō (後光, lit. "Background Light") – The Shinto-Buddhist equivalent of an Aureole or Halo.
- Goma (護摩) – a ritual involving making offerings into a consecrated fire. Initiated mostly by the Shingon sect.
- Gozan Seido (五山制度) – A nationwide network of **Zen** temples, called Five Mountain system or Five Mountains in English, with at its top five temples in Kamakura (the Kamakura Gozan) and five in Kyoto (the Kyoto Gozan), which during the Muromachi period was a de facto part of the government's infrastructure, helping rule the country.
- gongen (権現)
  - A Buddhist god that chooses to appear as a Japanese kami in order to take the Japanese to spiritual salvation.
  - Name sometimes used for **shrine**s (e.g. "Tokusō Gongen") before the **shinbutsu bunri**.
- gorintō* (五輪塔) – a type of **stupa** common in Buddhist temples and cemeteries consisting of five shapes (a cube, a sphere, a pyramid, a crescent and a lotus flower) one on top of the other representing the five elements of Buddhist cosmology.

== Gallery: A to G ==
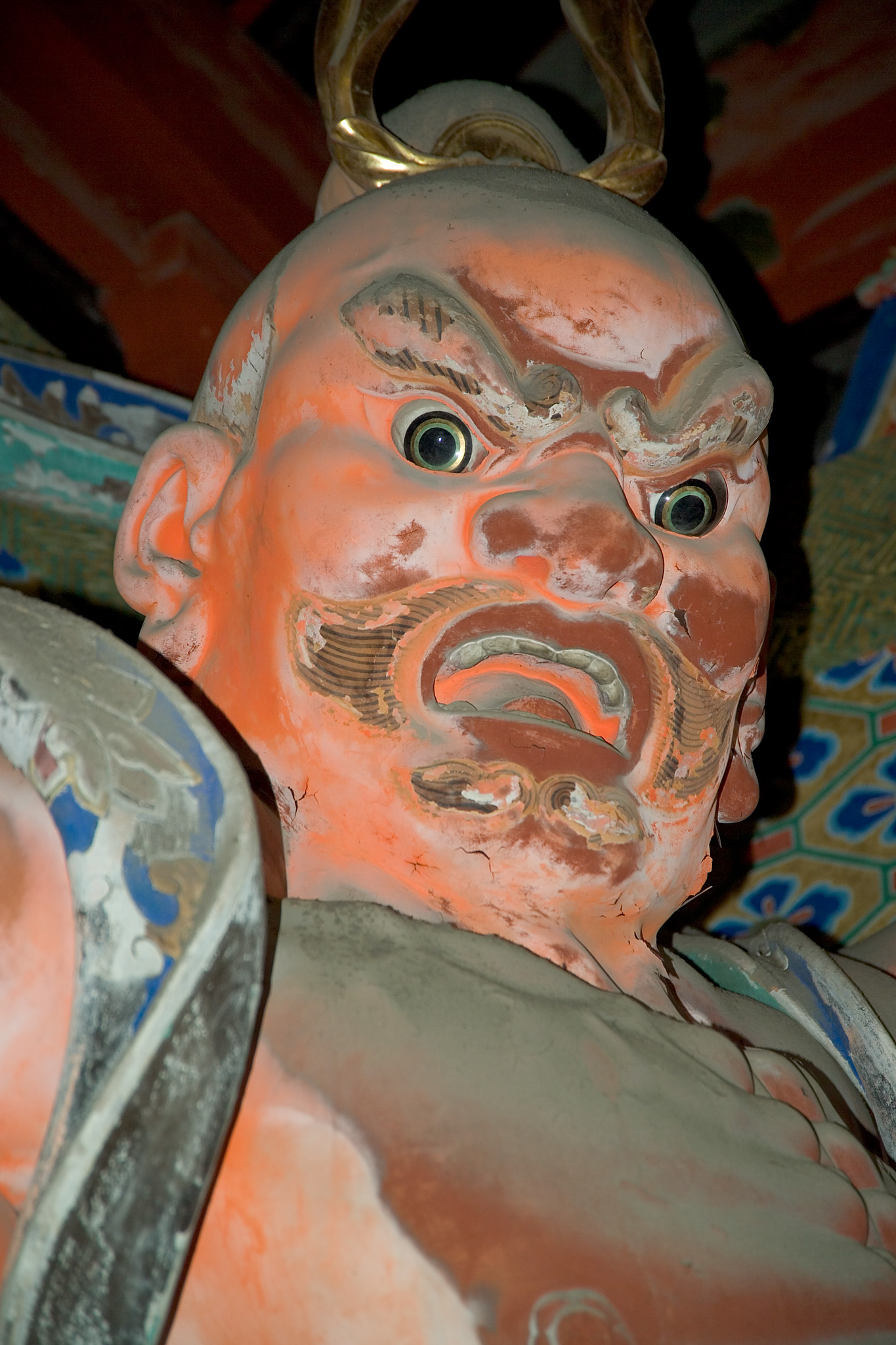
An example of agyō (in this case, a **Niō**)

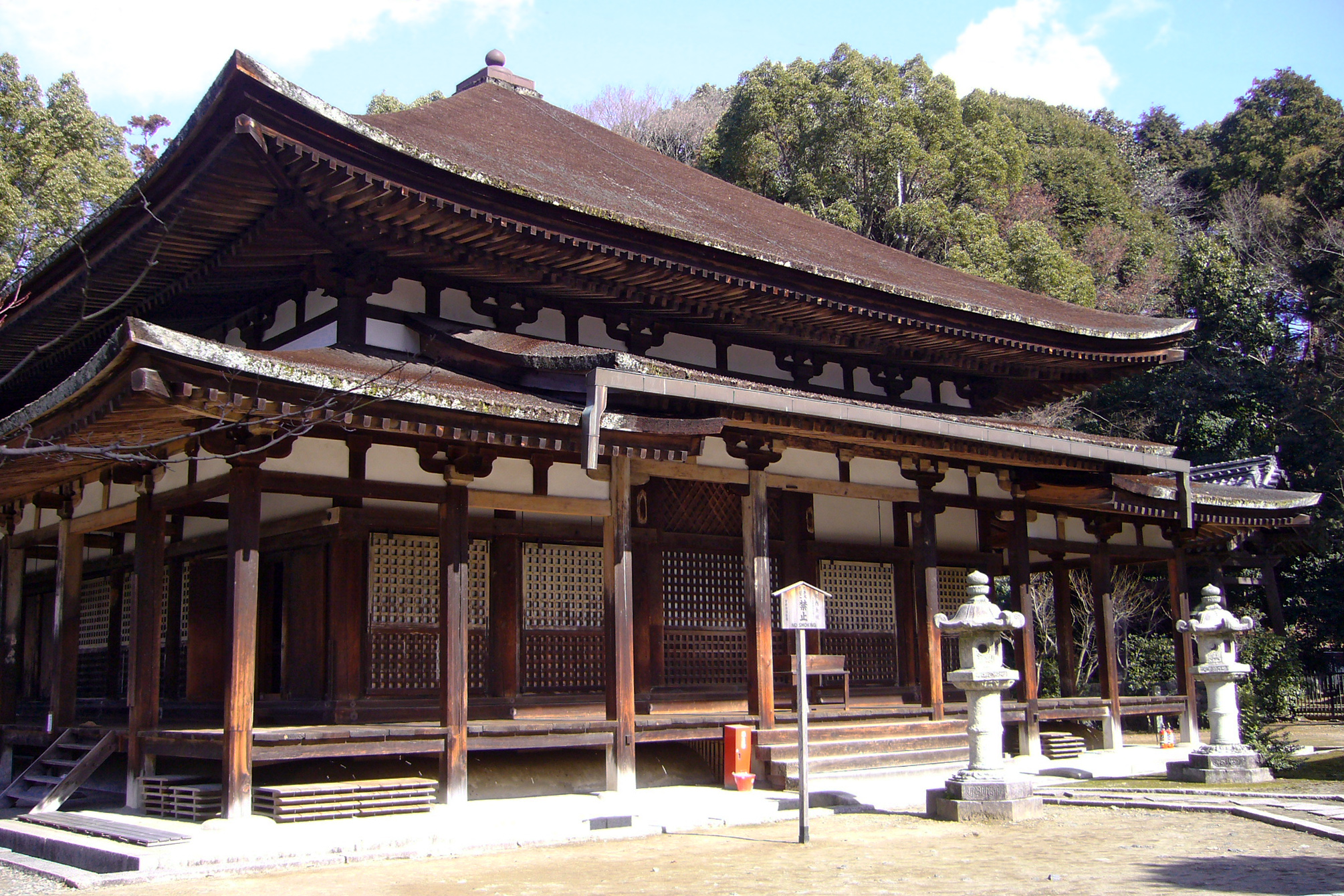
Hōkai-ji's Amida-dō

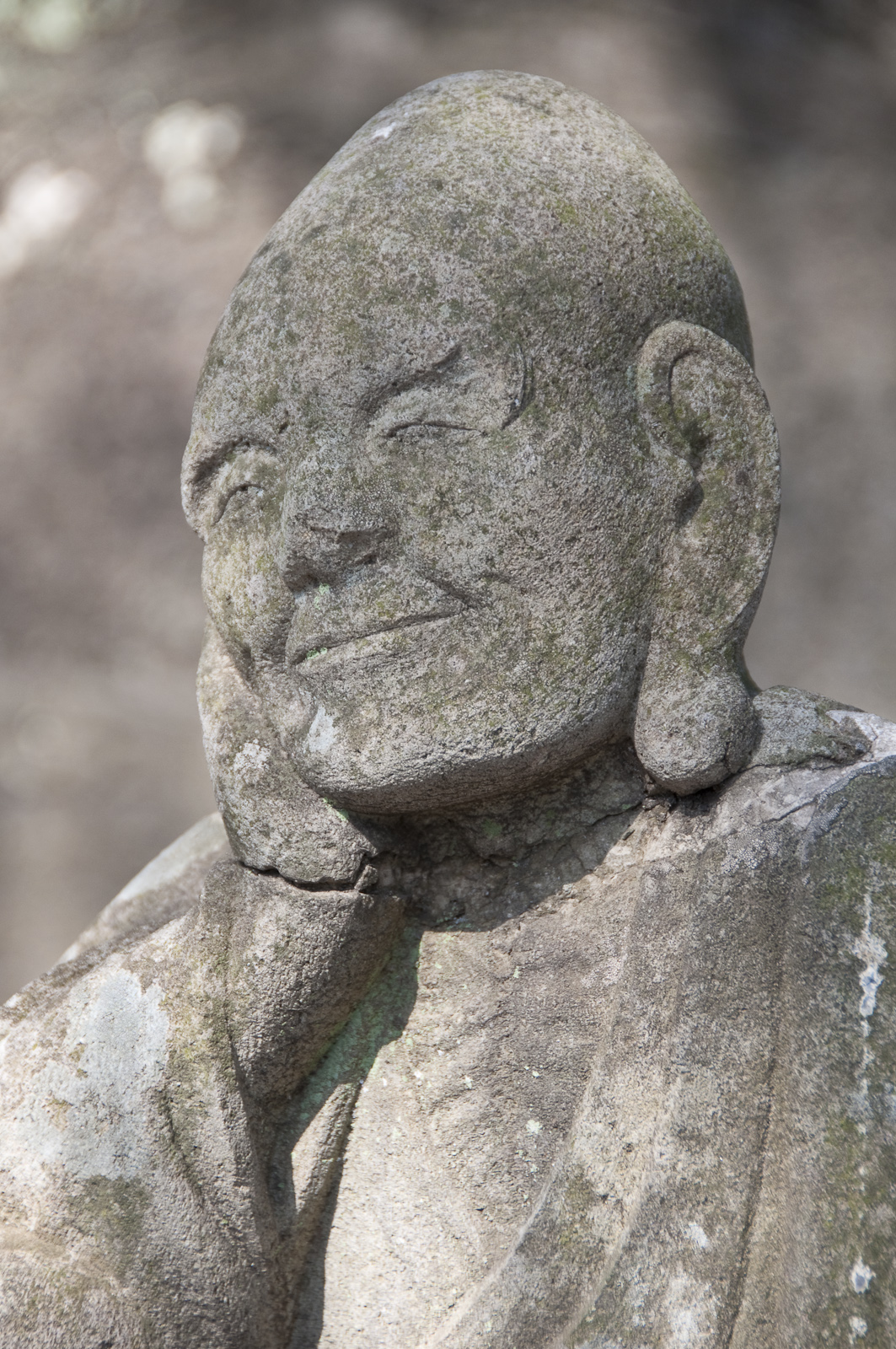
A statue of an arakan at Kita-in

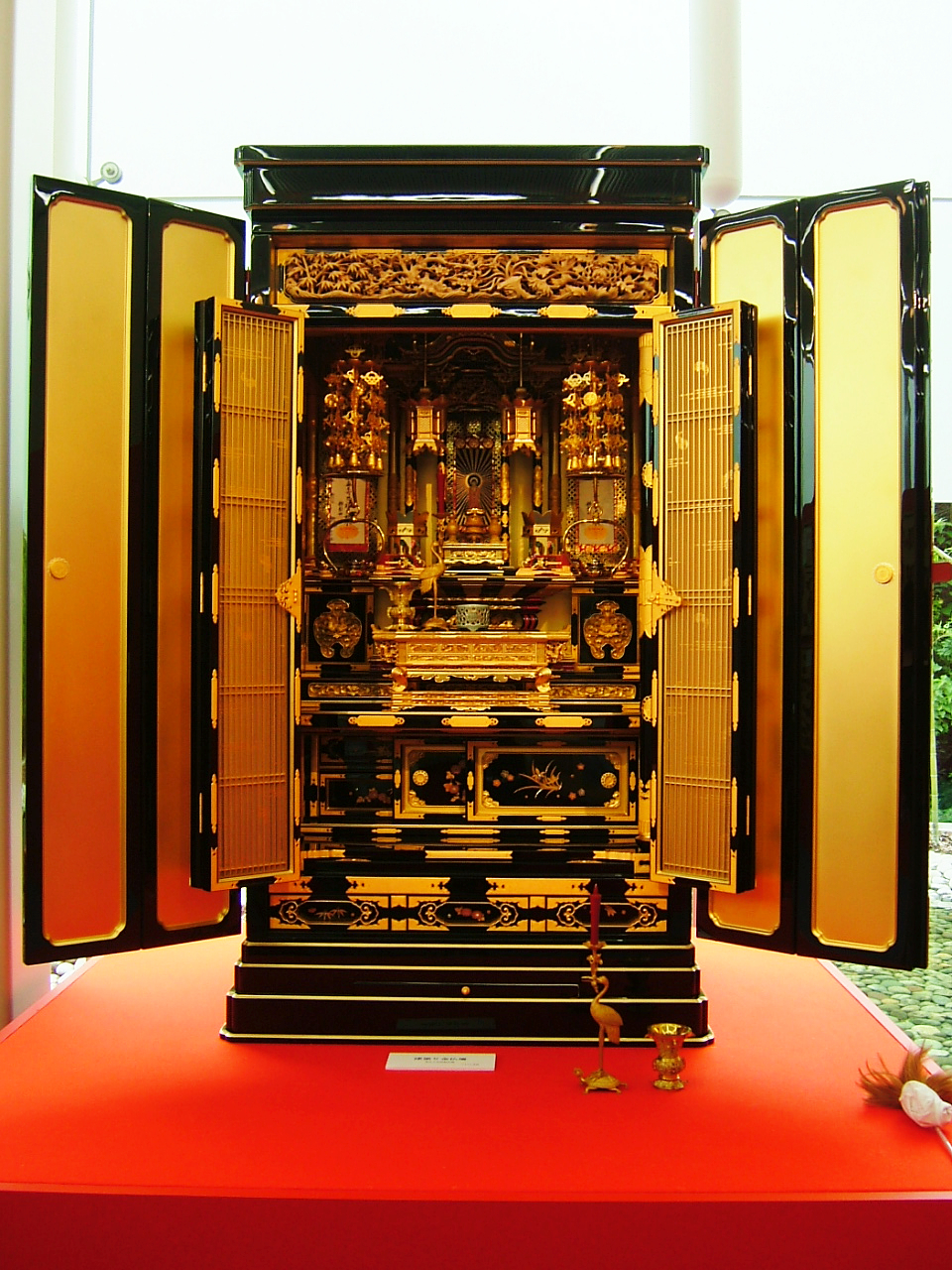
A butsudan

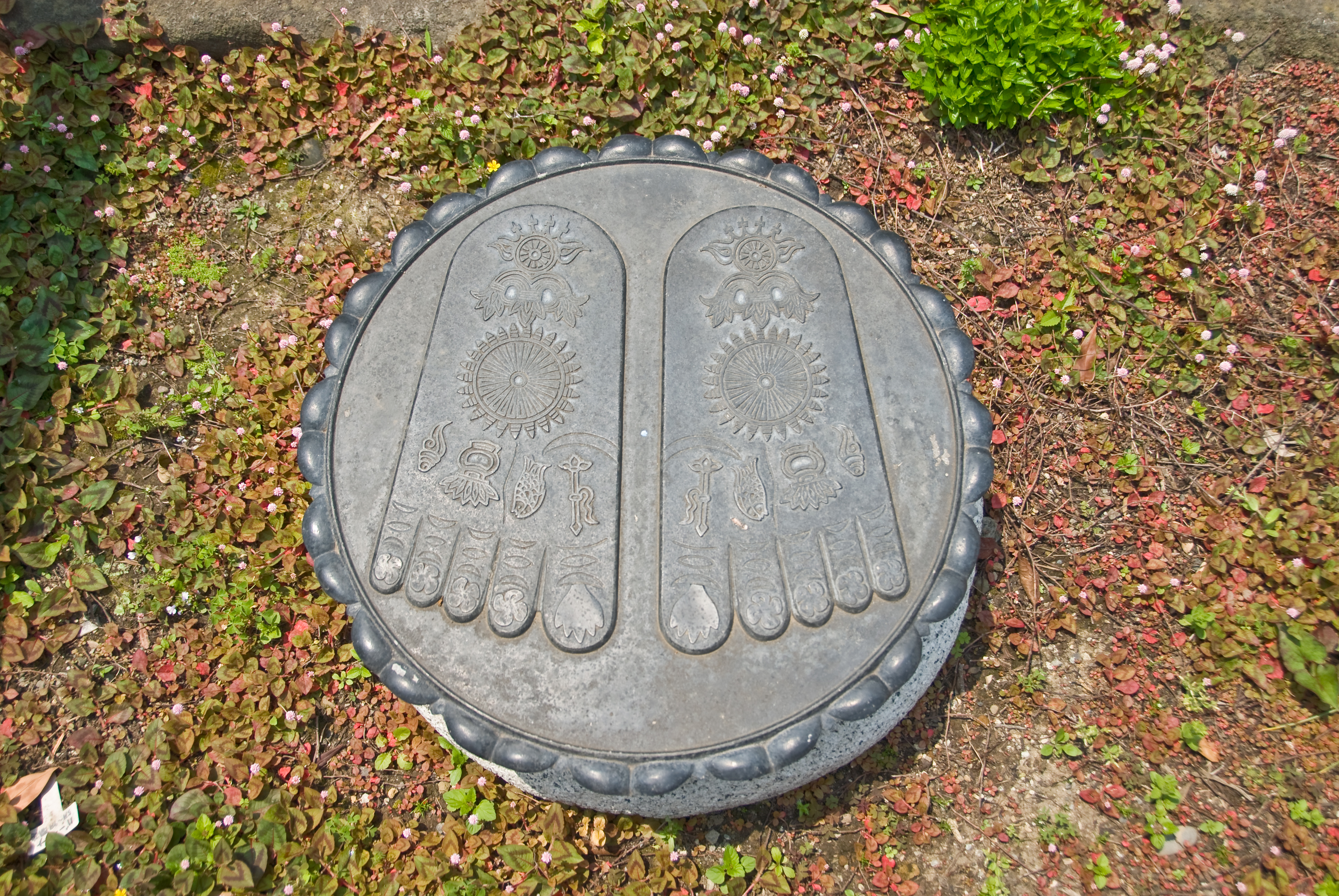
A bussokuseki

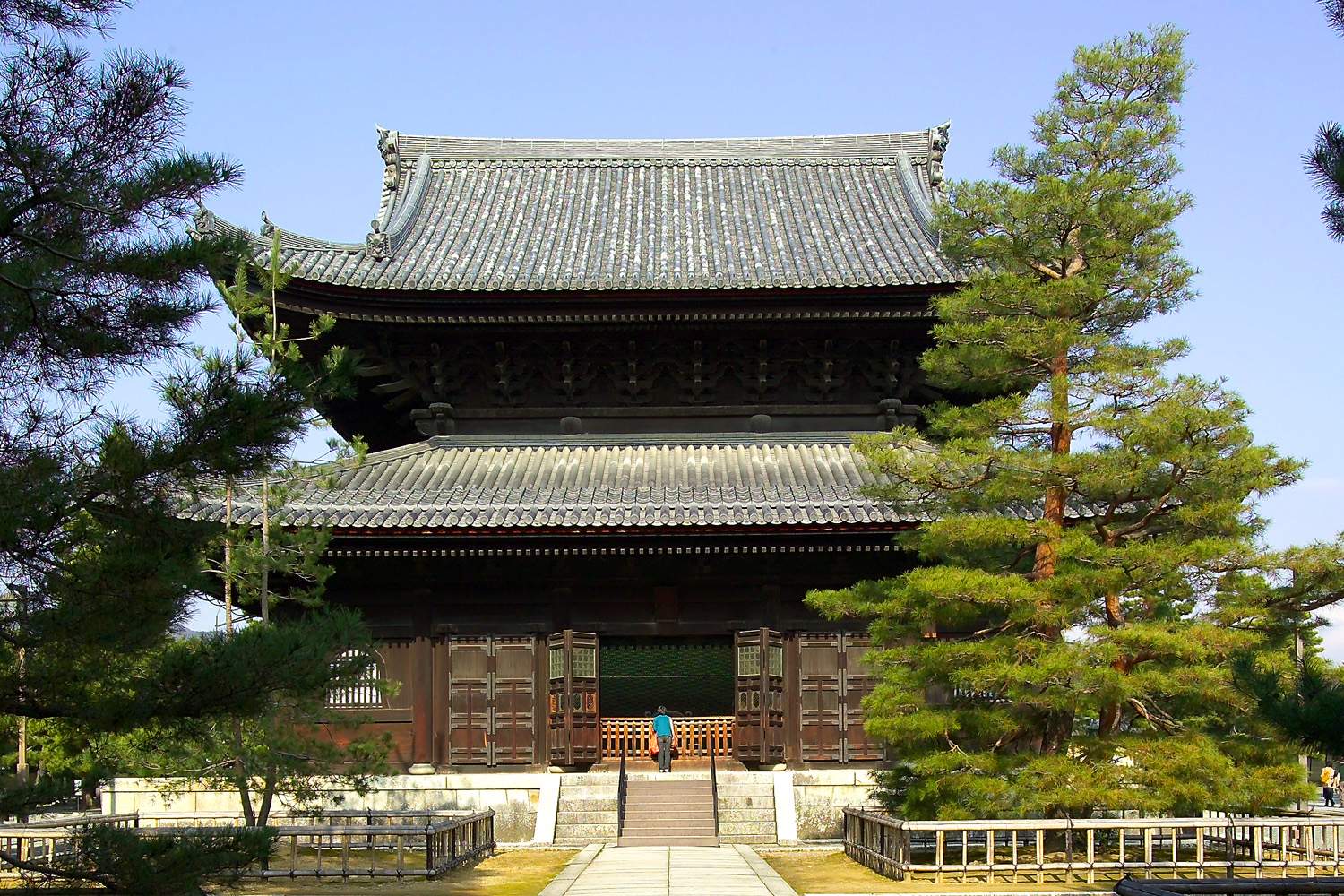
Myōshin-ji's Butsuden

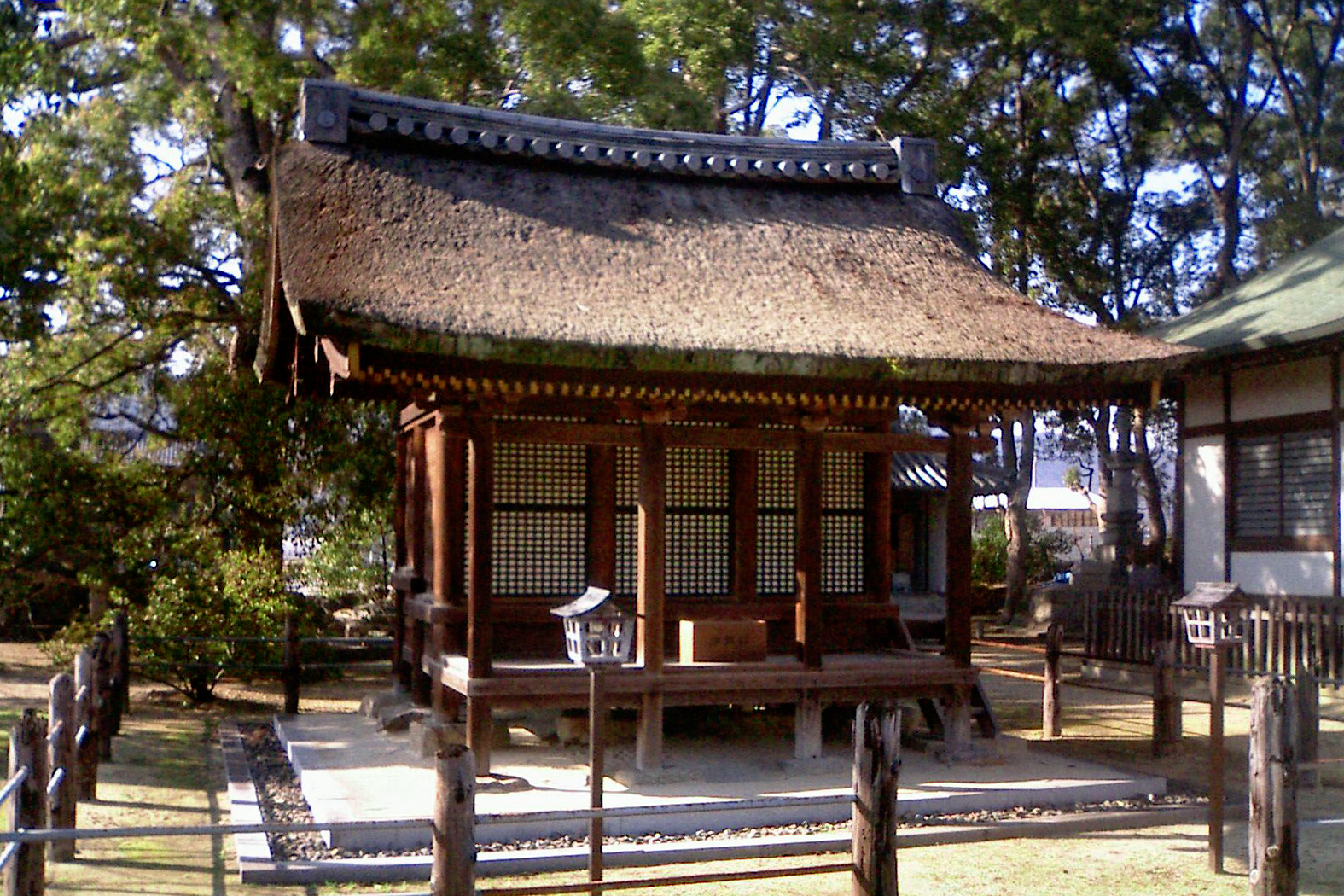
Motoyama-ji's chinjū-dō

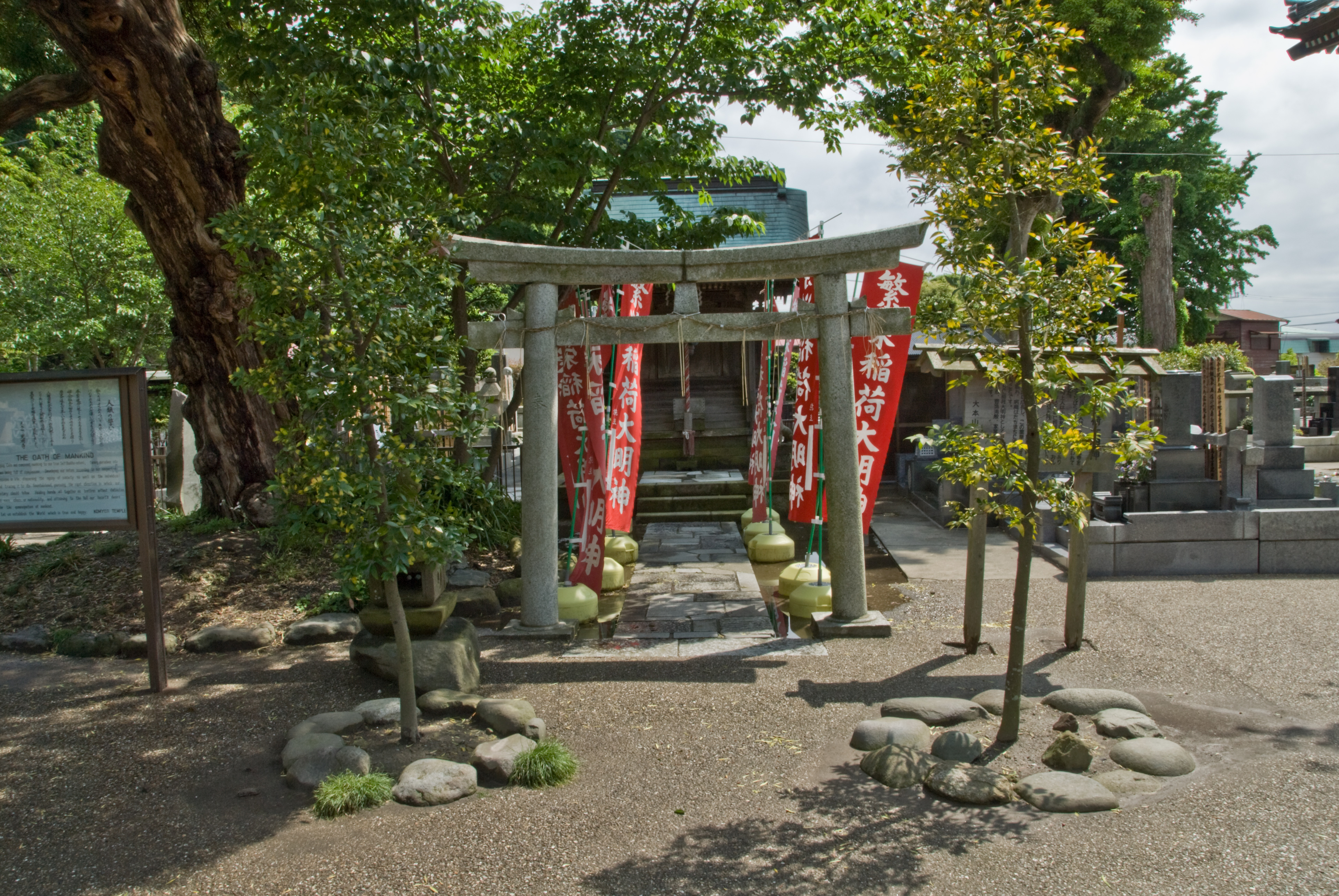
Kōmyō-ji's chinjūsha

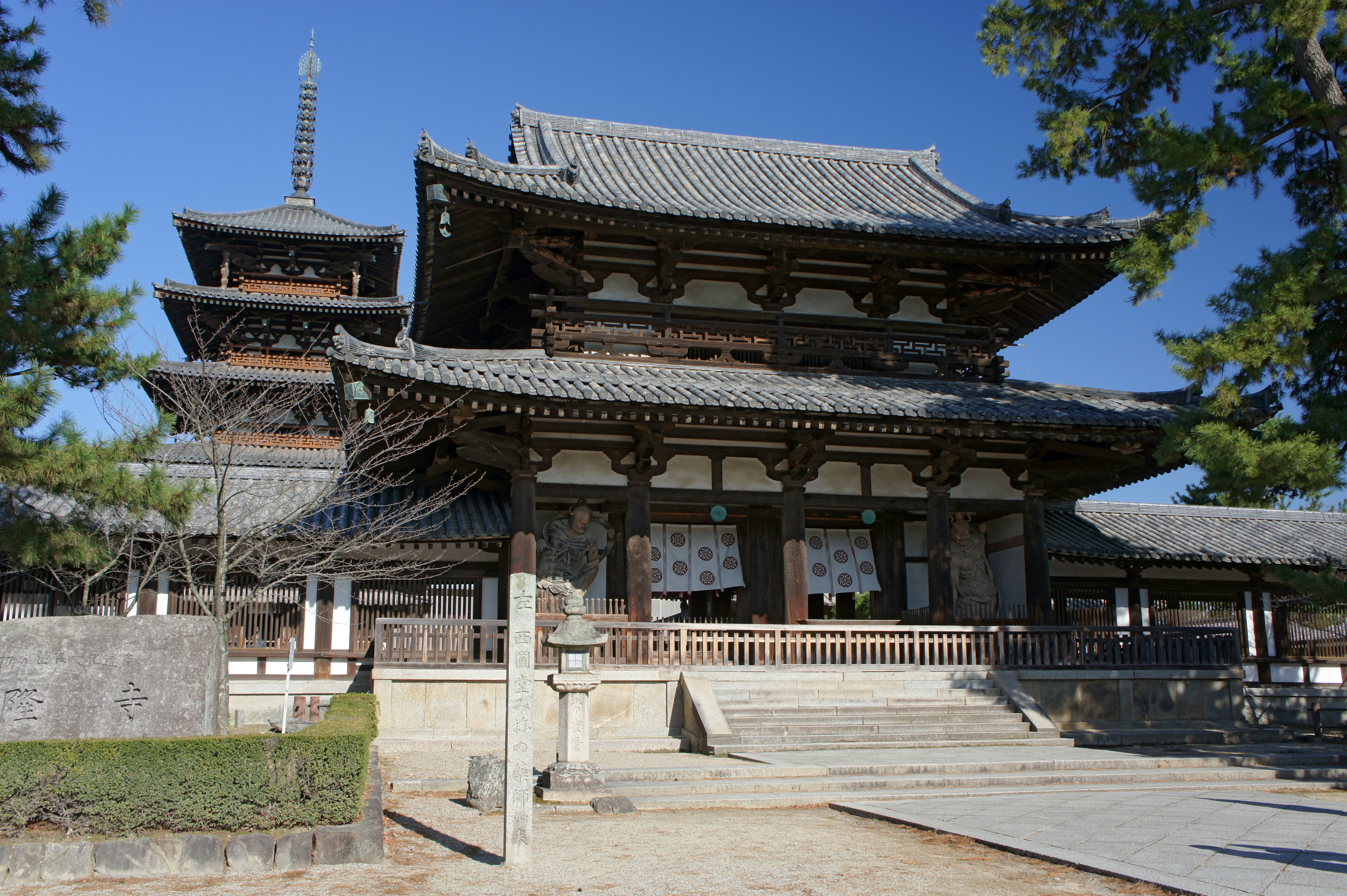
Chūmon at Hōryū-ji

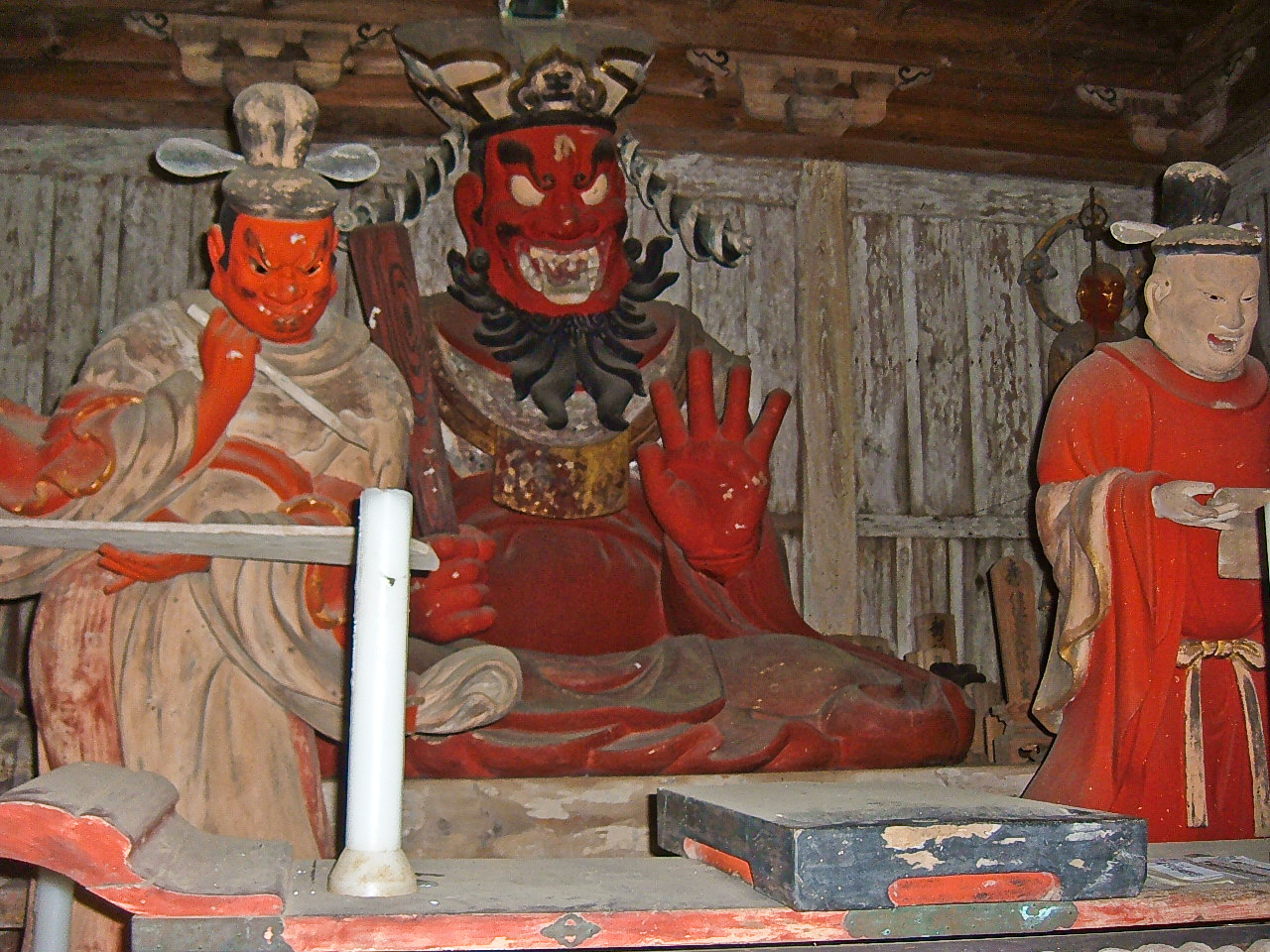
A statue of Enma

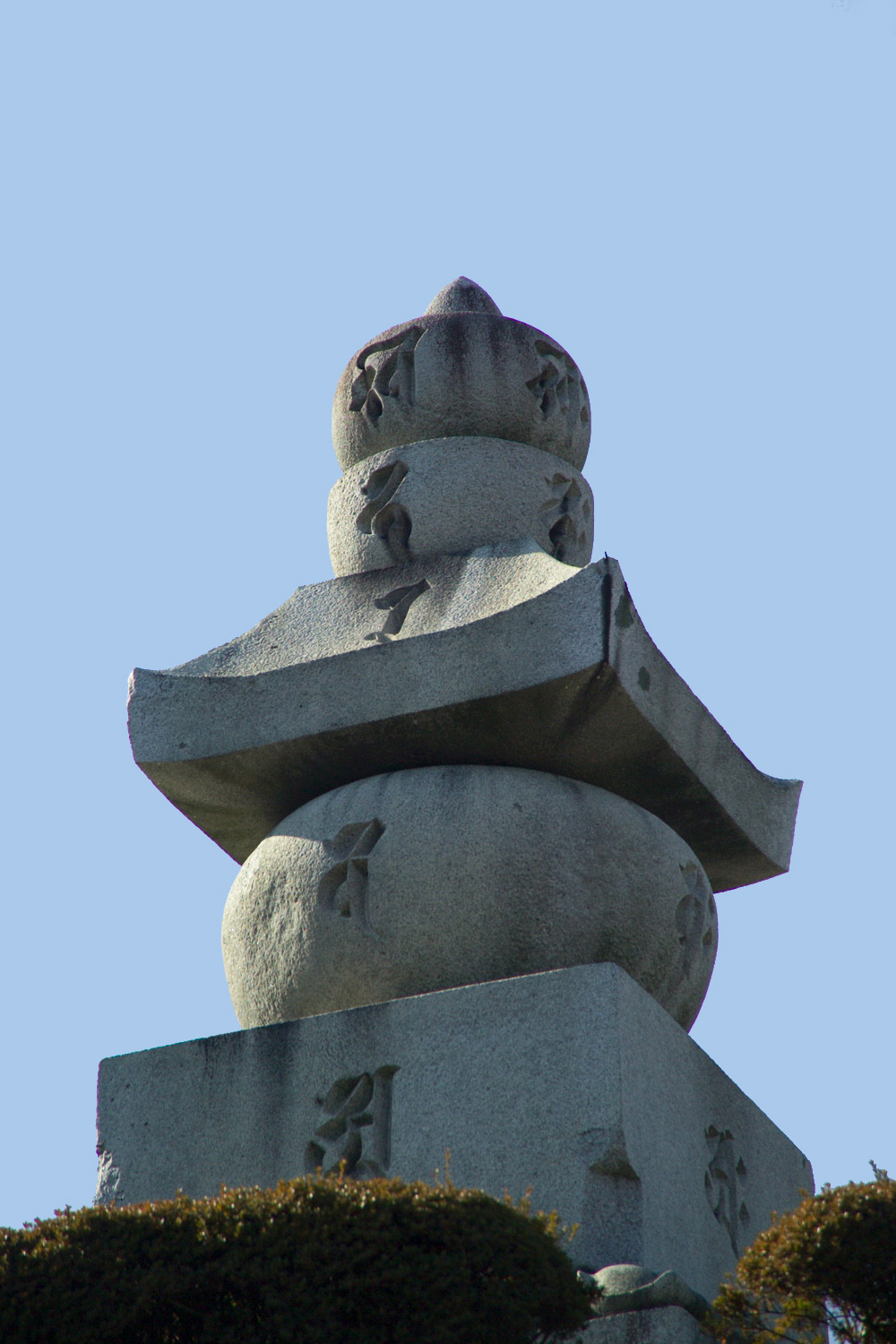
A gorintō

== H ==
- haibutsu kishaku
  - A current of thought, continuous in Japan's history, advocating the expulsion of Buddhism from Japan.
  - A wave of anti-Buddhist violence that hit Japan in 1868 after the forcible separation of Buddhism and Shinto (**shinbutsu bunri**).
- hall – see -**dō**
- han-honji suijaku (反本地垂迹) – a theory which in the 14th century reversed the **honji suijaku** theory, claiming kami were superior to Buddhist gods.
- hattō* (法堂) – lit. "**Dharma** hall". A building dedicated to lectures by the chief priest on Buddhism's scriptures (the **hō**).
- hō (法) – the teachings of Buddha (Dharma) and the **sūtra**s. Also called **buppō**.
- hō-dō (法堂) – see **hattō**.
- hōjō* (方丈) – the living quarters of the head priest of a Zen temple.
- Hokekyō or Hokkekyō (法華経) – the Lotus Sutra, one of the Buddhist sacred scriptures.
- Hokke-dō* (法華堂) – lit. "Lotus Sūtra hall". In Tendai Buddhism, a hall whose layout allows walking around a statue for meditation. The purpose of walking is to concentrate on the **Hokekyō** and seek the ultimate truth.
- hōkyō-zukuri* (宝形造) – a type of roof consisting of four or more sloping, curved triangles meeting at the top. An example is Hōryū-ji's Yume-dono.
- hōkyōintō* (宝篋印塔) – a tower-shaped variant of a **stupa**, so called because it originally contained the Hōkyōin Dharani **sutra**. See also **stupa**.
- hōmyō (法名) – religious name received after votes (Buddhist name) or posthumous name given to a deceased person.
- honbō* (本坊) – residence of the **jushoku**, or head priest, of a temple.
- hon-dō* (本堂) – Lit. "main hall", it is the building that houses the most important statues and objects of cult. The term is thought to have evolved to avoid the term **kon-dō** used by six Nara sects (the **Nanto Rokushū**) for their main halls. Structurally similar, but less strictly defined.
- honji suijaku (本地垂迹) – a theory common in Japan before the Meiji period according to which Buddhist deities choose to appear as native kami to the Japanese in order to save them.
- hotoke (仏)
  - Japanese term meaning for **buddha** (an enlightened one).
  - A Buddhist sacred image or statue.
  - A deceased person or his/her soul.
- hōtō (宝塔) – lit. treasure tower. A stone **stupa** constituted by a square base, a barrel-shaped body, a pyramid and a finial. Not to be confused with the similarly shaped tahōtō.
- hyakudoishi* (百度石) – lit. "hundred times stone". Sometimes present as a point of reference for the **hyakudomairi** near the entrance of a **shrine** or Buddhist temple.
- hyakudomairi (百度参り) – literally "a hundred visits". A worshiper with a special prayer will visit the temple a hundred times. After praying, he or she must go at least back to the entrance or around a **hyakudoishi** for the next visit to count as a separate visit.

== Gallery: H ==
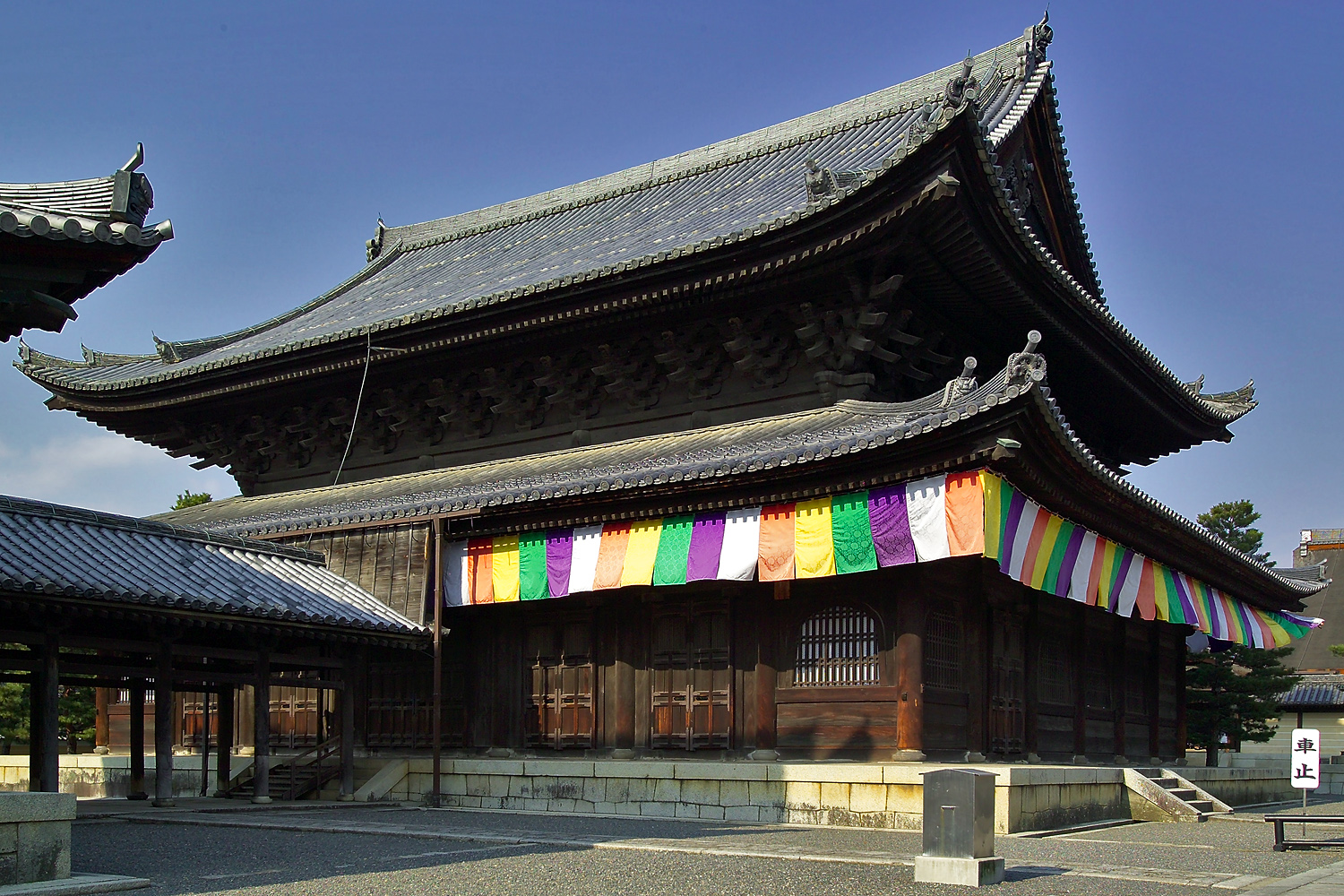
Myōshin-ji's hattō

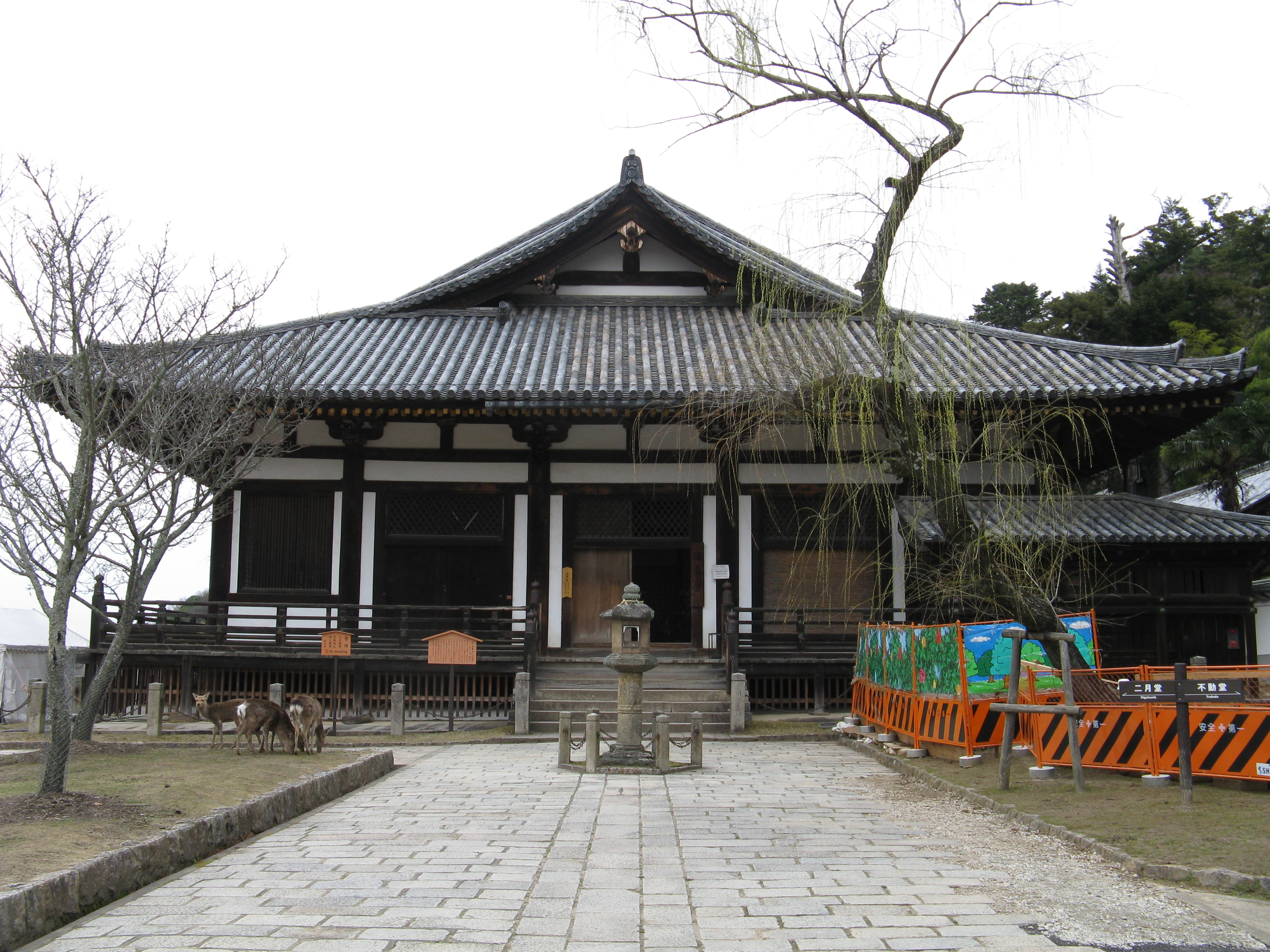
Tōdai-ji's Hokke-dō

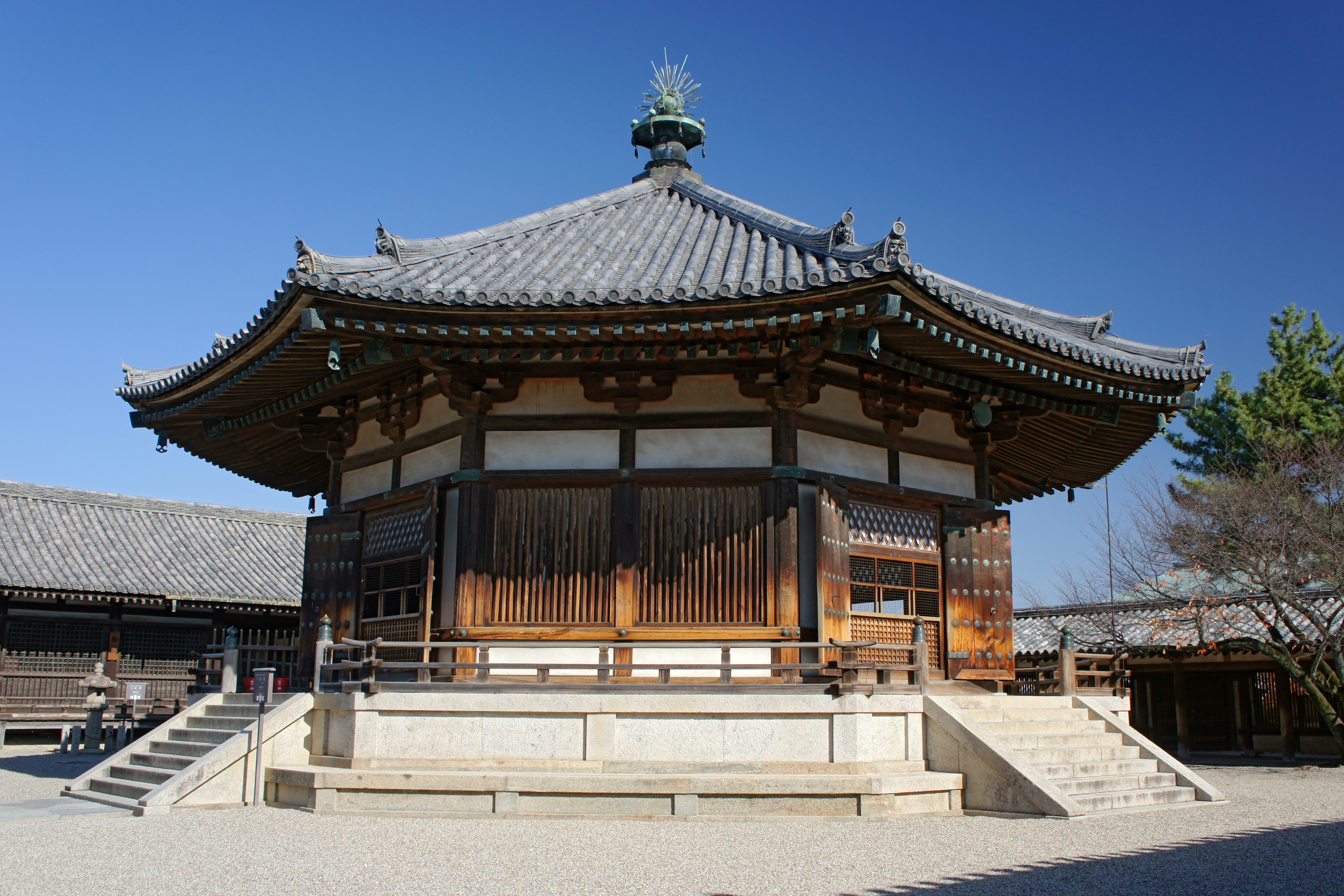
An example of hōkyō-zukuri: Hōryū-ji's Yume-dono

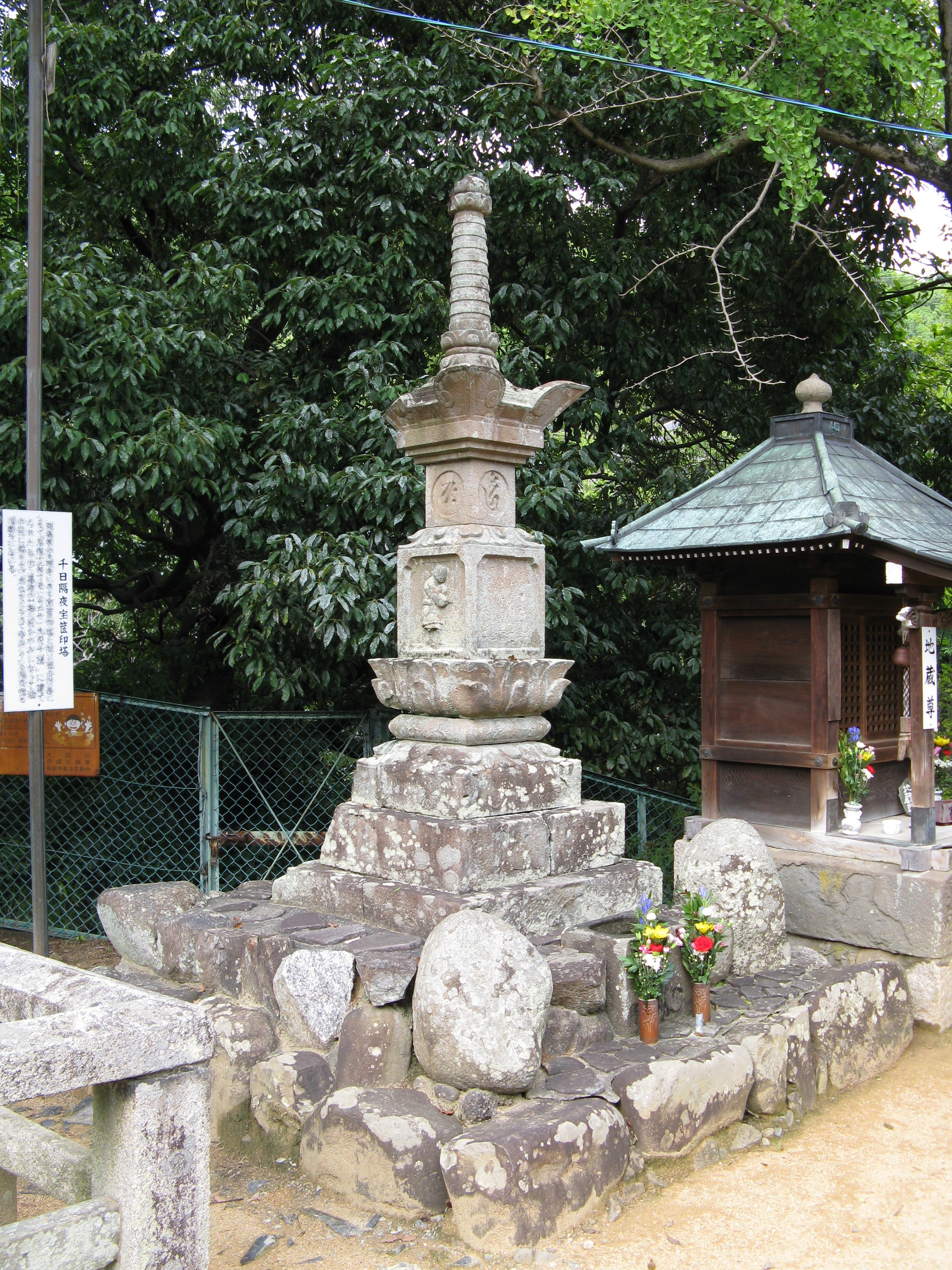
A hōkyōintō

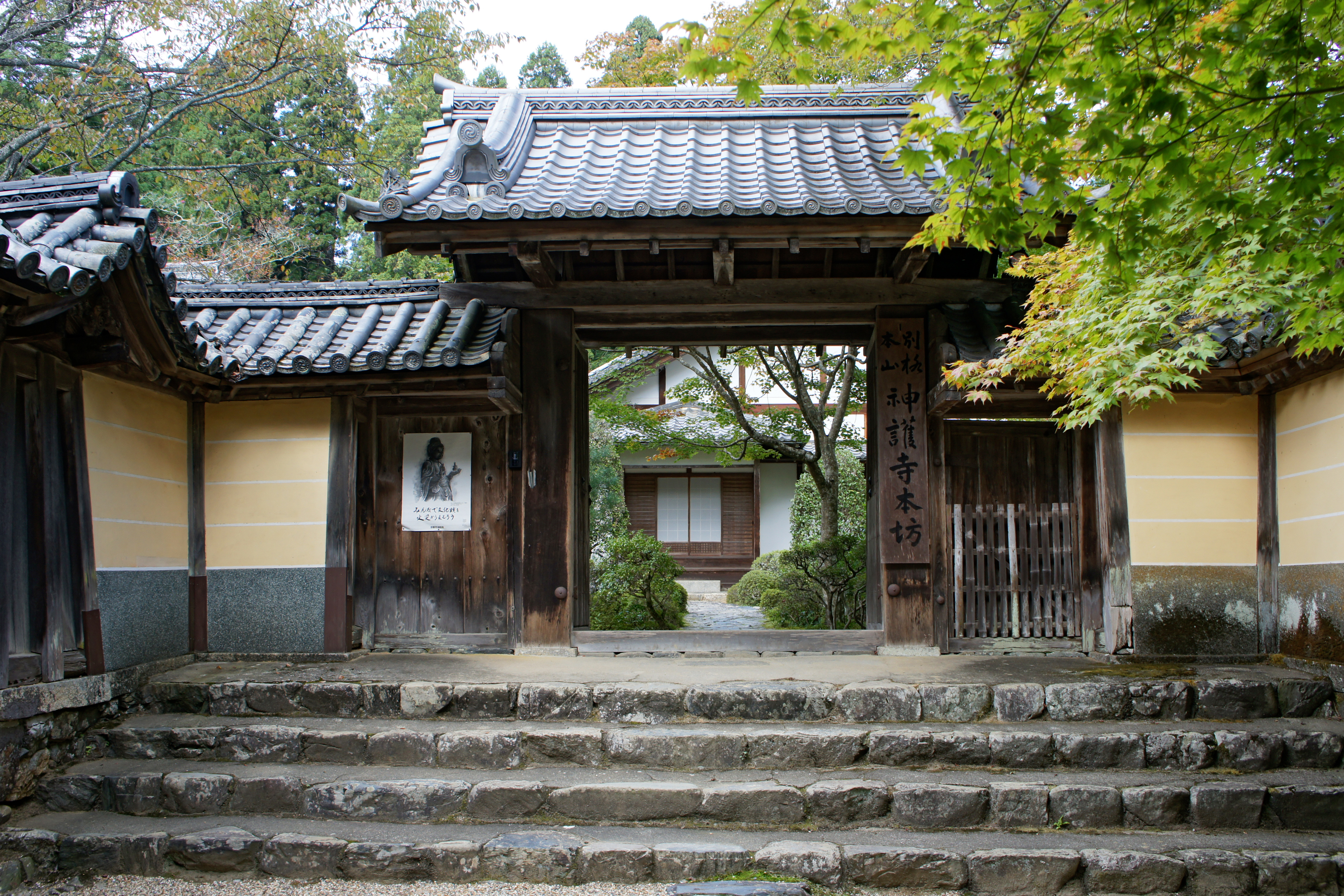
Jingo-ji's honbō

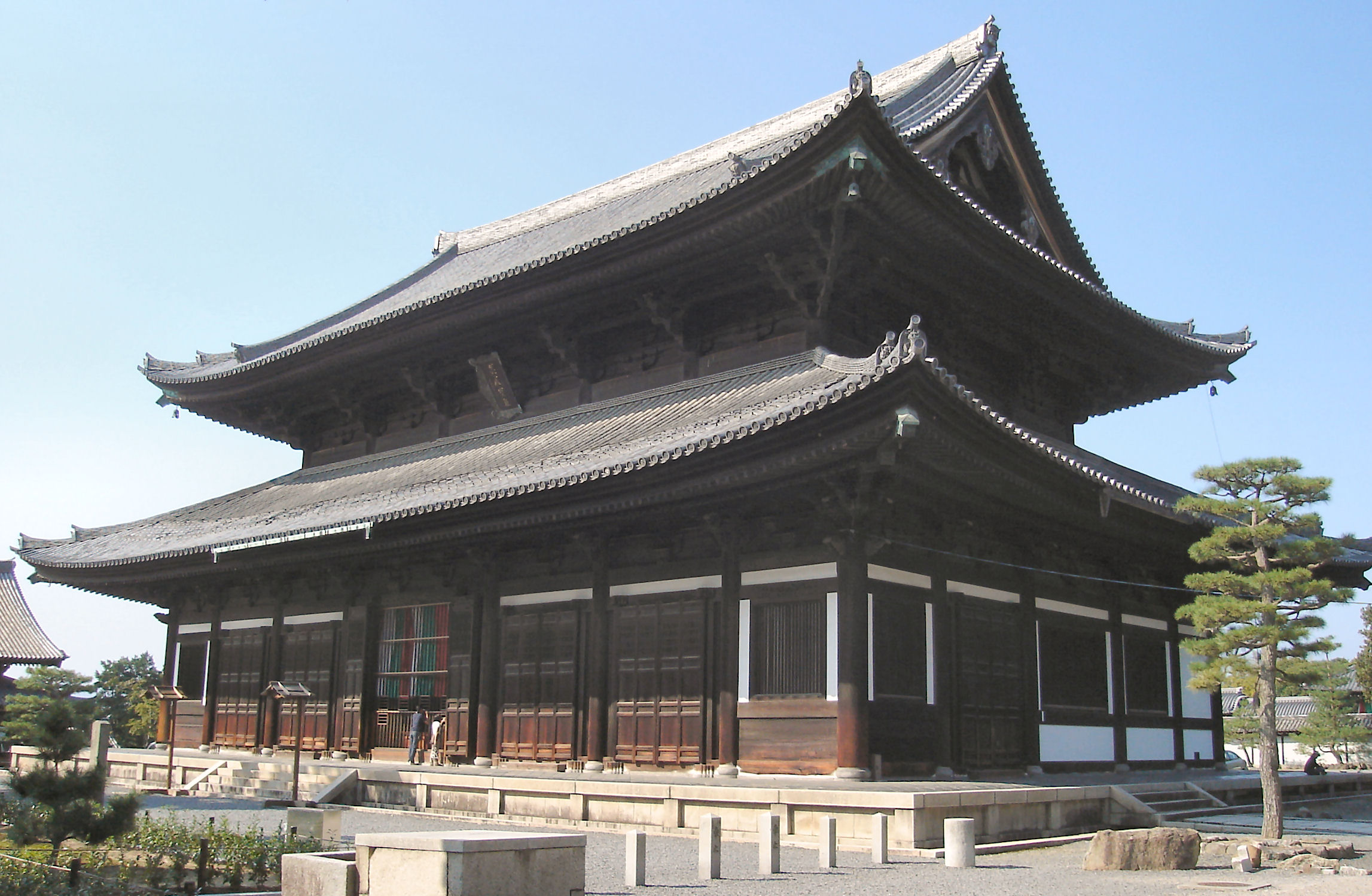
A hon-dō

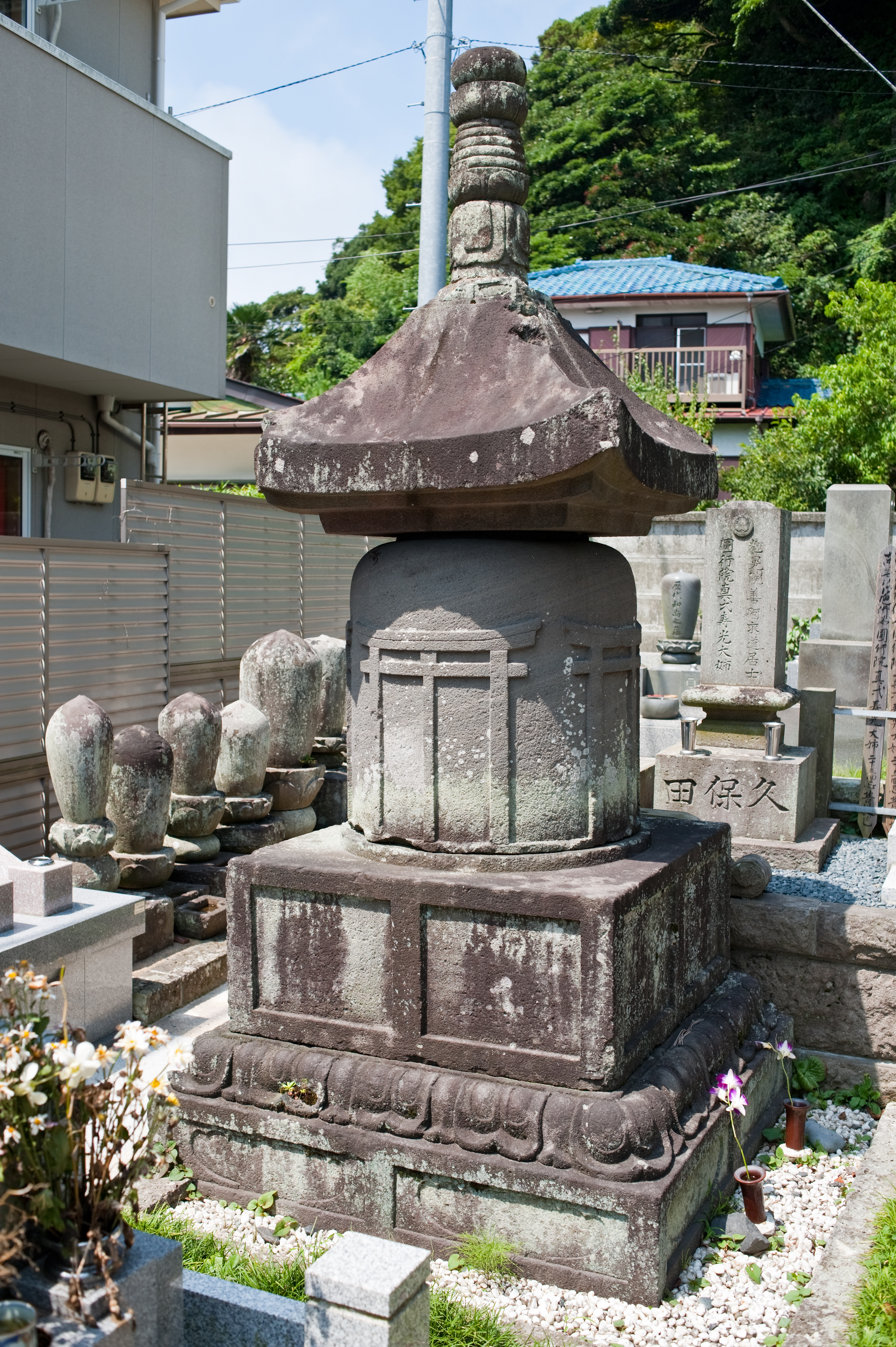
A hōtō

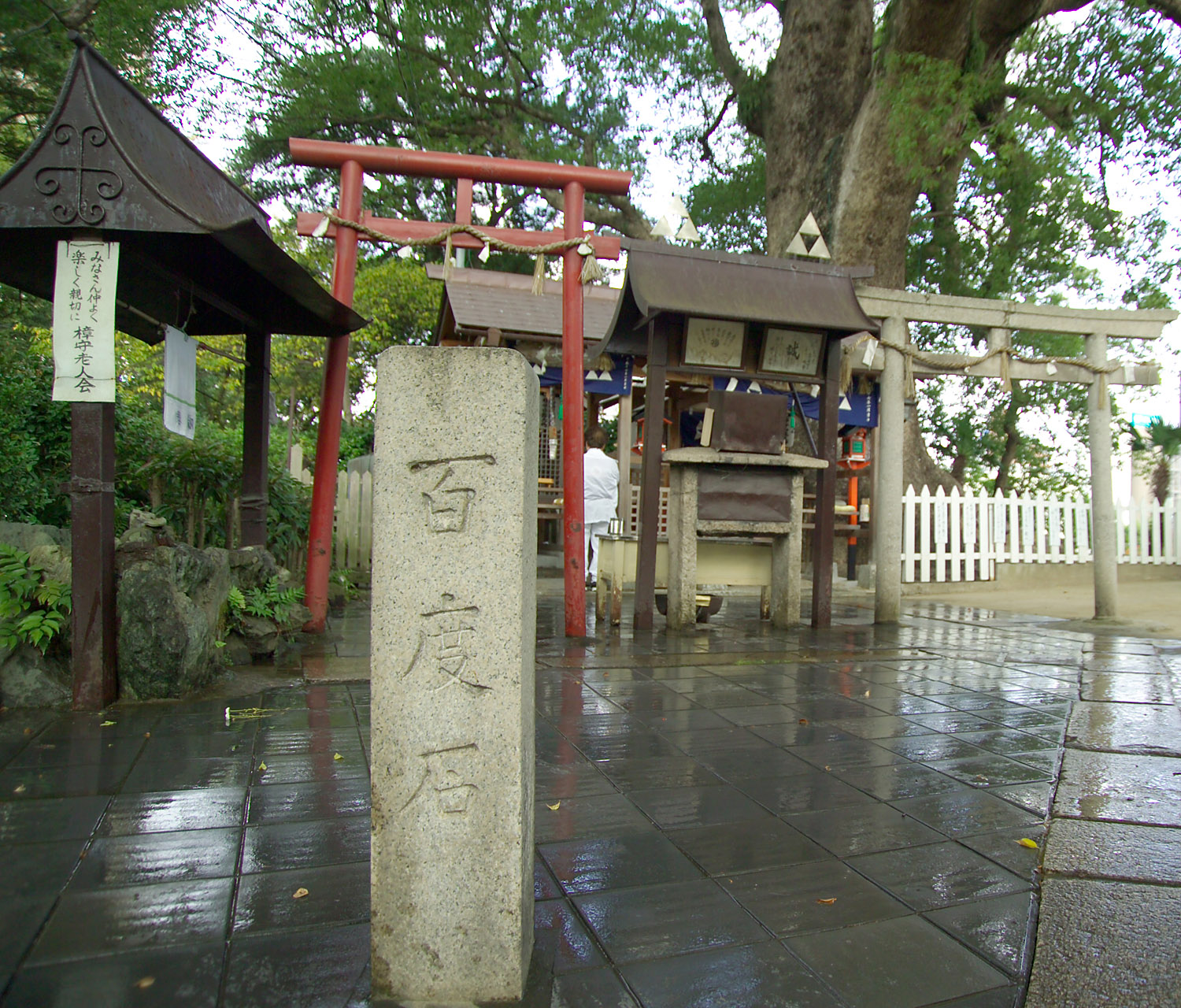
A hyakudoishi

== I ==
- Indō (引導, lit. "Requiem") – requiem; (Buddhist) prayers for the dead.
- ingō (院号) -
  - The part of a temple's full name ending in "-in" (e.g. "Toeizan Kan'ei-ji **Endon'in**"). The other two are the **sangō** and the **jigō**.
  - The part of a **hōmyō** or **kaimyō** (posthumous names) ending in "-in".
- inzō* (印相) – a mudrā, or Buddhist hand gesture, common in Buddhist religious statues.
- inverted honji suijaku – See **han-honji suijaku**.
- irimoya-zukuri – A hip roof (sloping down on all four sides) integrated on two opposing sides with a gable.

== J ==
- jigō (寺号) – a temple's main name. Often the second after the **sangō**, and the only one in common use (e.g. "Tōeizan **Kan'ei-ji** Endon'in"). The last name is called the **ingō**. The use of the sangō came into fashion after the arrival of Zen Buddhism to Japan.
- Jizō* (地蔵) – Ksitigarbha Bodhisattva; god guardian of children, particularly children who died before their parents, often seen wearing red votive bibs (**yodarekake**) and hats. Parents sometimes leave at the temple a small Jizō statue in memory of their lost child.
- jiki-dō* (食堂) – a monastery's refectory. See also **sai-dō**.
- Jiriki (自力) - one's own strength
- Jūni Shinnō – see Jūni Shinshō.
- Jūni Shinshō* (十二神将) – Twelve retainers who accompany **Yakushi Nyorai**. Also known as Jūni Yakusha Taishō (十二薬叉大将) and Jūni Shinnō (十二神王). In English they are often called the Twelve Heavenly Generals.
- Jūni Yakusha Taishō – see Jūni Shinshō.
- Jūroku Rakan (十六羅漢) – lit. "sixteen **arhat**s", holy men who were at Gautama Buddha's deathbed and there were ordered by him to stay in this world to defend and maintain his teachings. They are worshiped mainly by **Zen** sects.
- jūji (住持) – see jūshoku.
- jūshoku (住職) – The chief priest of a temple or monastery.

== K ==
- kaimyō (戒名) – see **hōmyō**.
- kairō* (回廊・廻廊) – a long and roofed portico-like passage connecting two buildings.
- kaisan-dō (開山堂) – founder's hall, usually at a Zen temple. Building enshrining a statue, portrait or memorial tablet of the founder of either the temple or the sect it belongs to. Jōdo sect temples often call it **miei-dō**.
- Kamakura Gozan – see **Gozan Seido**.
- kami (神) – term broadly meaning "deity", but having with several separate meanings.
  - deities mentioned in Japanese mythologies and local deities protecting areas, villages and families.
  - unnamed and non-anthropomorphic spirits found in natural phenomena.
  - a general sense of sacred power.
- Kankiten (歓喜天) – the Buddhist version of Hindu god Ganesh, usually represented by two elephant-headed human beings embracing each other.
- Kannon (観音)- the goddess of mercy and compassion, found not only in temples, but also in Shinto **shrines**.
- karamon (唐門) – generic term for a gate with an arched roof. See also **mon**.
- karesansui* (枯山水) – lit. dry landscape. A Japanese rock garden, often present in Zen temples, and sometimes found in temples of other sects too.
- katōmado* (華頭窓) – a bell shaped window originally developed at Zen temples in China, but widely used by other Buddhist sects as well as in lay buildings.
- **Kekkai (結界, lit. 'Fastened-off World')** – a restriction in access to a specific area, barred-off often for the purposes of training &/or purification in esoteric Buddhism (and Hinduism).
- ken* (間)
  - counter for the spaces between pillars (translated as **bay** in English). A first rank **sanmon** is for example five ken across.
  - unit of measurement equivalent to 197 cm until around 1650, when it was shortened to 181.8 to indirectly increase land taxes.
- keshin (化身) – a personification of a deity, an Avatar.
- kirizuma-zukuri (切妻造) – a roof style involving the use of two gables (gabled roof).
- kō-dō* (講堂) – lecture hall of a non-Zen **garan**.
- kokubun-ji – provincial temples (kokubun-ji (国分寺) for monks; kokubun-niji (国分尼寺) for nuns) established by Emperor Shōmu in each province of Japan. Tōdai-ji served as the head of all the kokubun-ji and Hokke-ji of the kokubun-niji.
- kon-dō* (金堂) – lit. "golden hall", it is the main hall of a **garan**, housing the main object of worship. Unlike a **butsuden**, it is a true two-story building (although the second story may sometimes be missing) measuring 9x7 bays.
- komainu (狛犬) – lit. "Korean dogs". Lion-like figures placed at the entrance of a temple or shrine to ward off evils spirits. Called "lion-dogs" in English.
- Kongōrikishi* (金剛力士) – see **Niō**.
- Korean dogs – See komainu.
- korō or kurō (鼓楼) – tower housing a drum that marks the passing of time. It used to face the shōrō and lie next to the **kō-dō**, but now the drum is usually kept in the **rōmon**.
- Kuji-in (九字印, lit. 'Nine Hand Seals') – A system of mudras and associated mantras that consist of nine syllables.
- Kuji-kiri (九字切り, lit. 'Nine Symbolic Cuts') – A system of mudras and associated mantras that consist of nine syllables, based on Kuji-in.
- kuin* (庫院) – kitchen/office of a Zen **garan**. A building hosting the galleys, the kitchen, and the offices of a temple. Usually situated in front and to the side of the **butsuden**, facing the **sō-dō**. Also called **kuri**.
- kuri (庫裏) – see kuin
- kyō-dō (経堂) – see **kyōzō**.
- Kyoto Gozan – see **Gozan Seido**.
- kyōzō (経蔵) – lit. "scriptures deposit". Repository of sūtras and books about the temple's history. Also called **kyō–dō**.

== Gallery: I to K ==
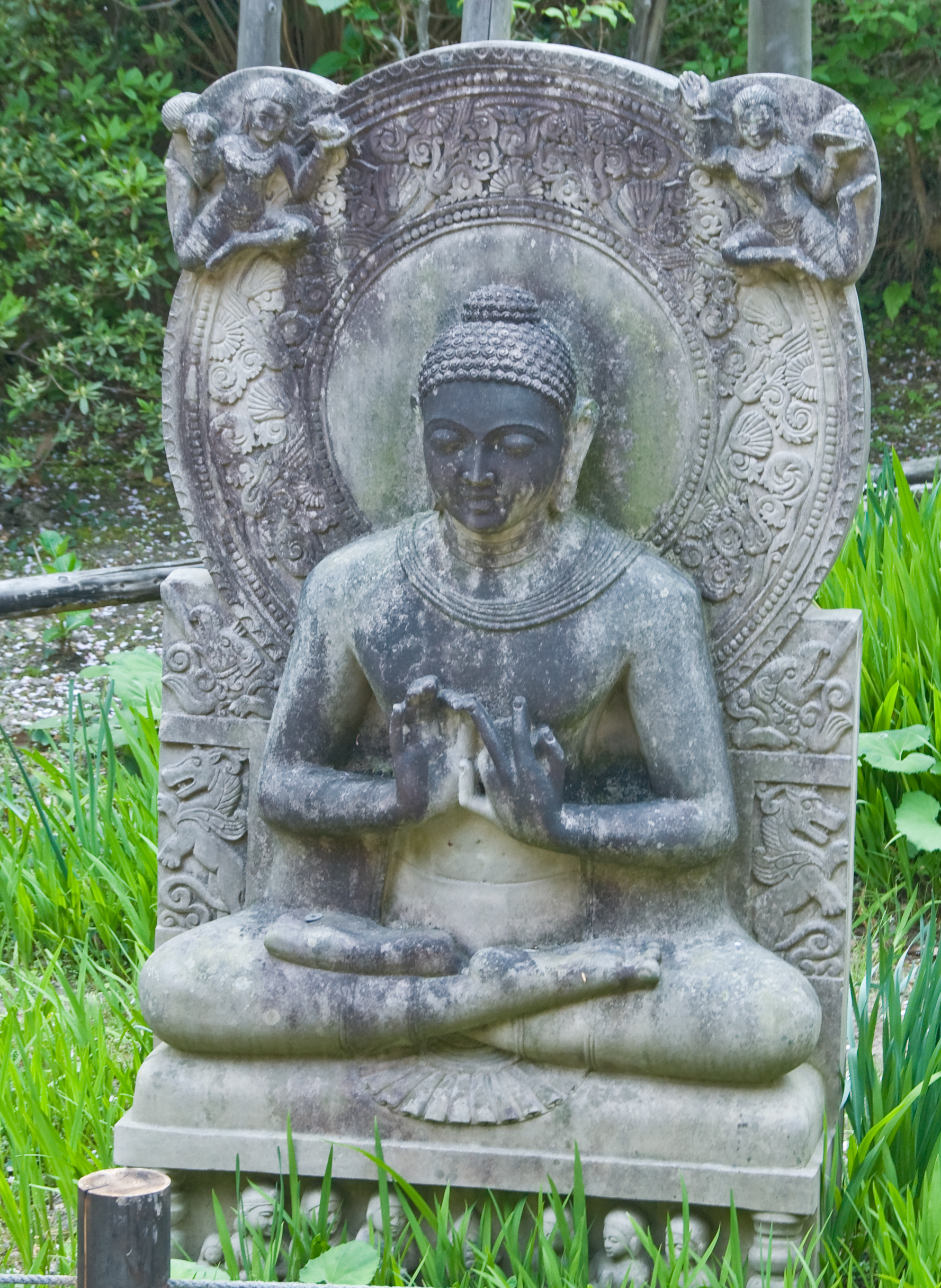
Buddha making an inzō

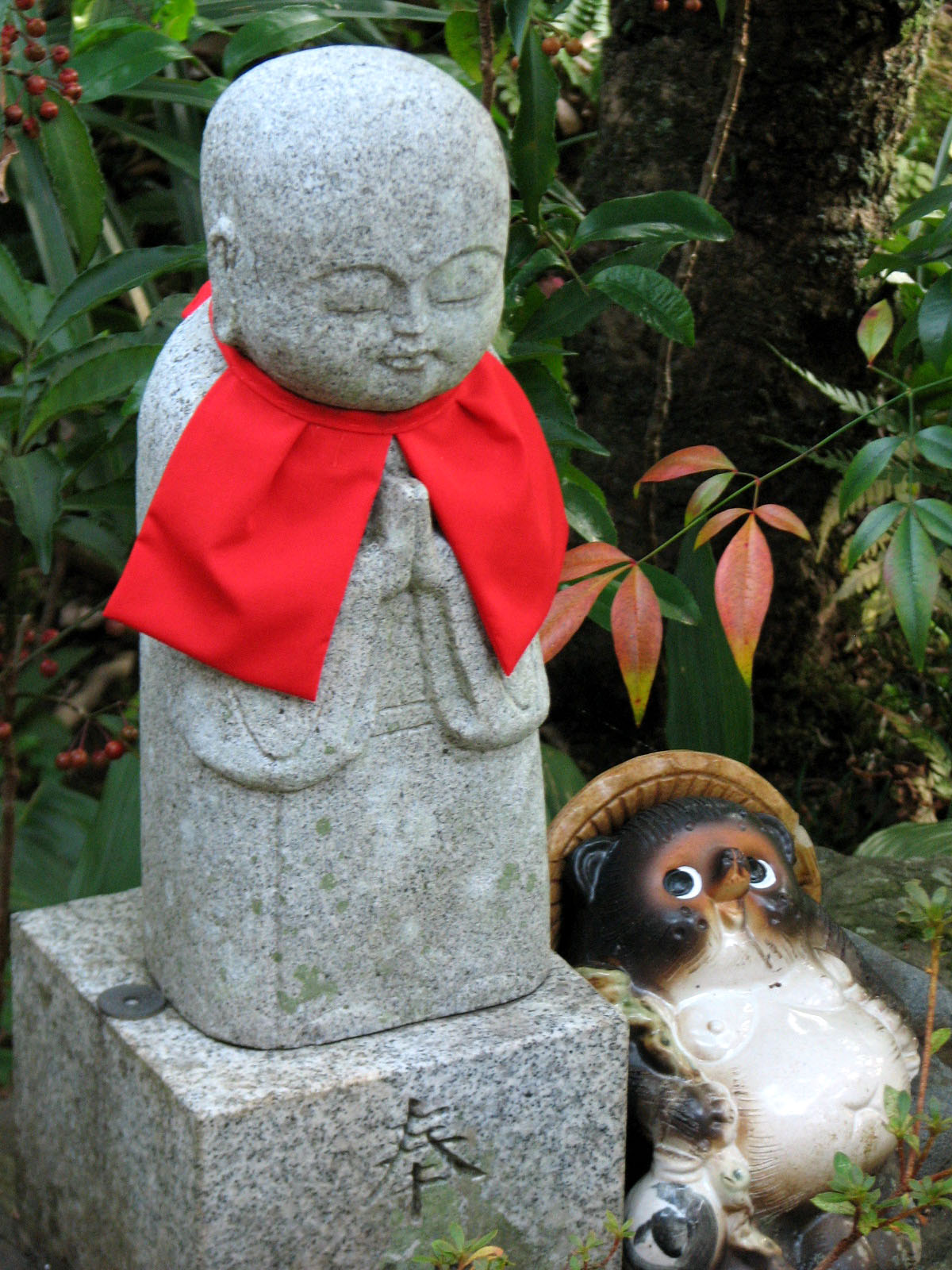
A jizō

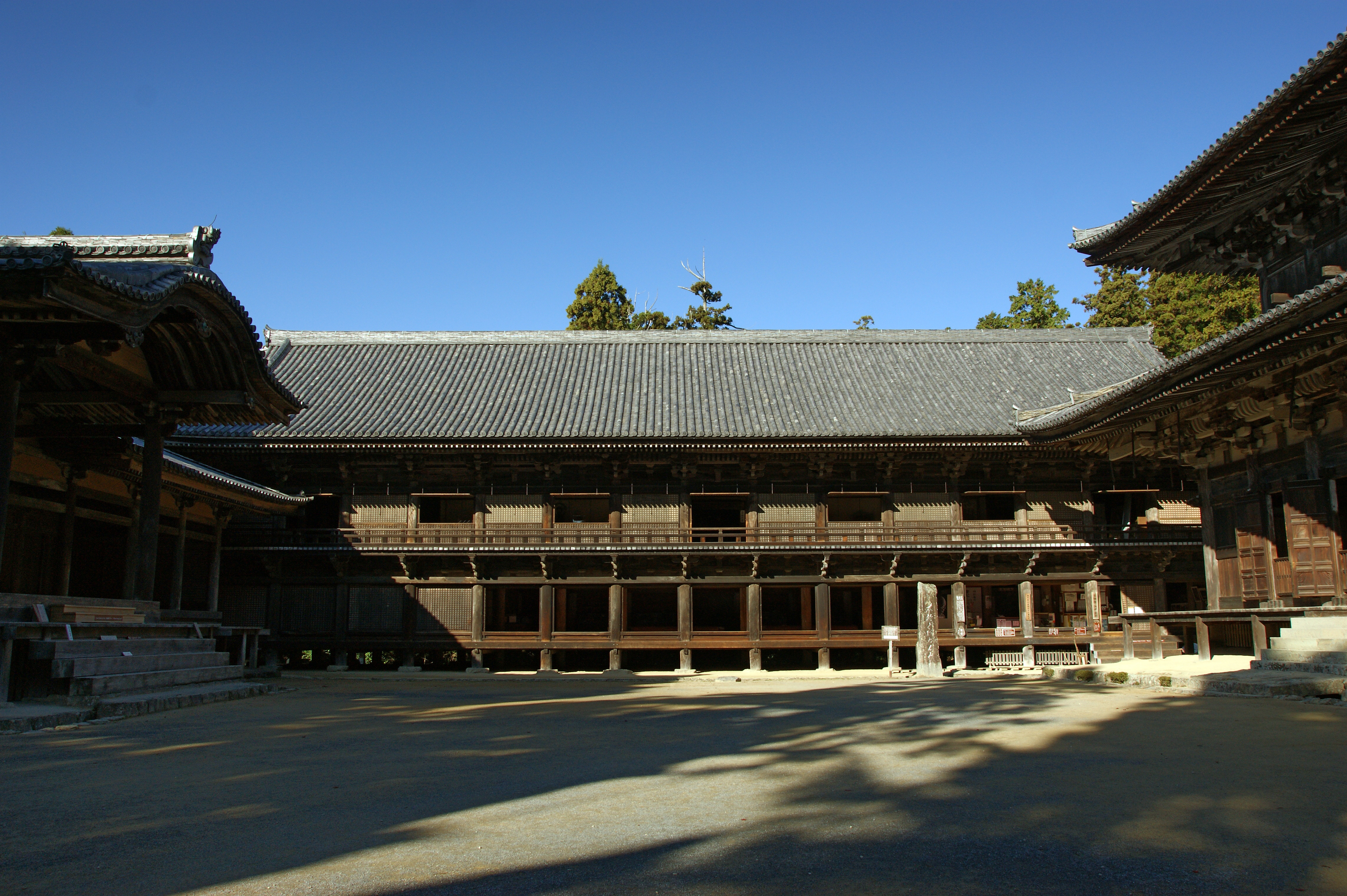
Engyō-ji's jiki-dō

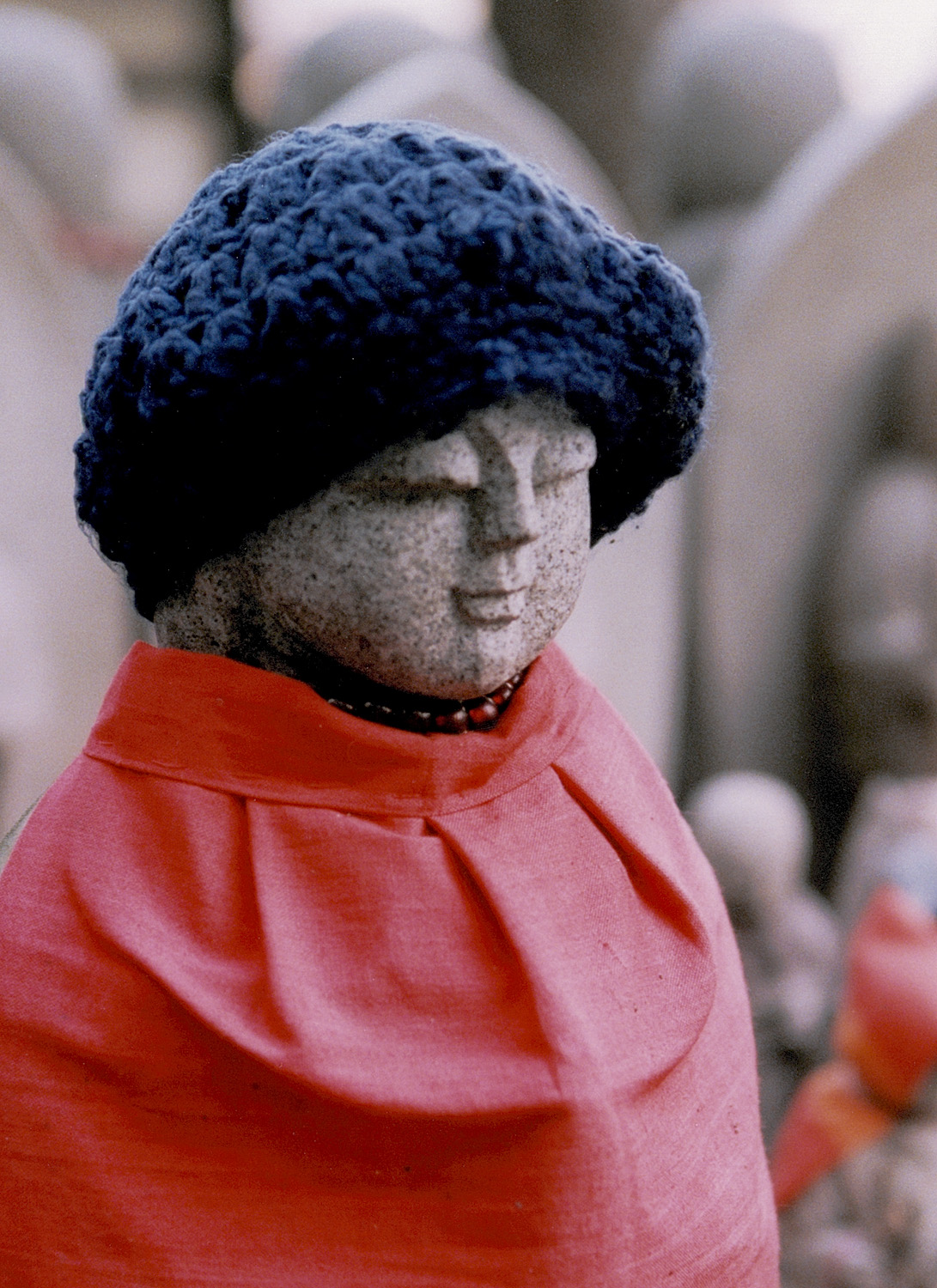
A jizō with a votive bib and a woolen hat

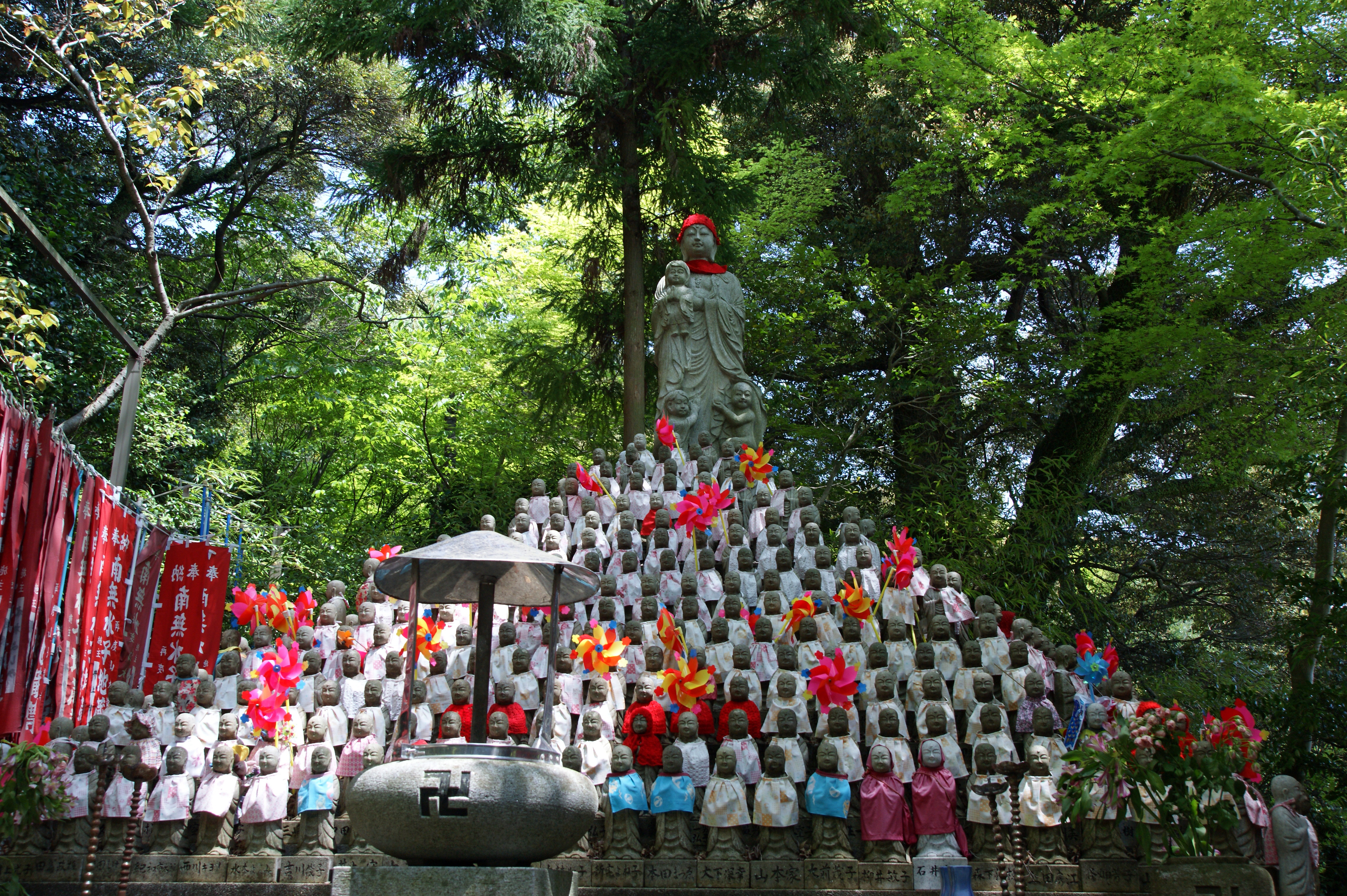
Jizō, each representing a lost child

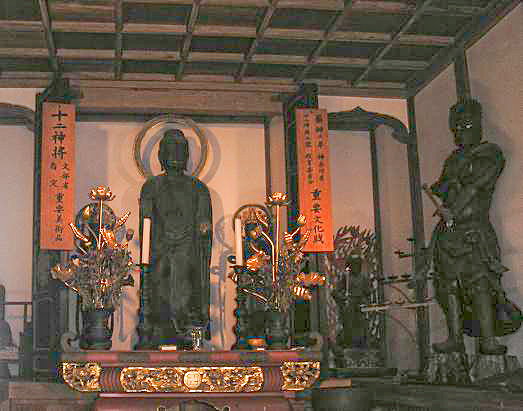
Yakushi flanked by one of the Jūni Shinshō

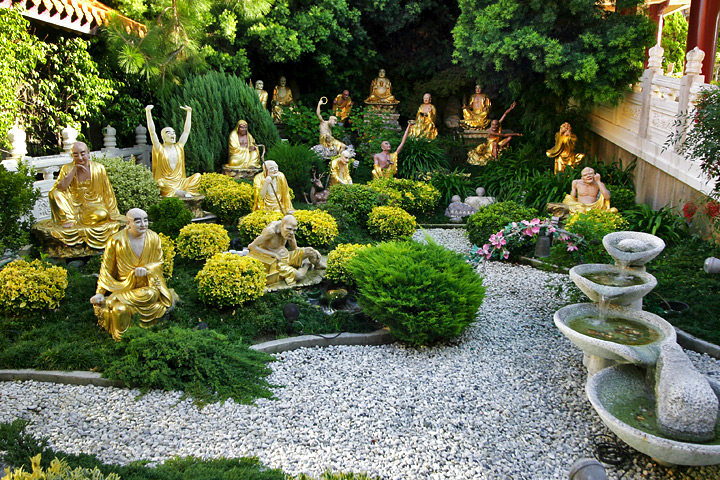
The Jūroku Rakan, or Sixteen Arhats

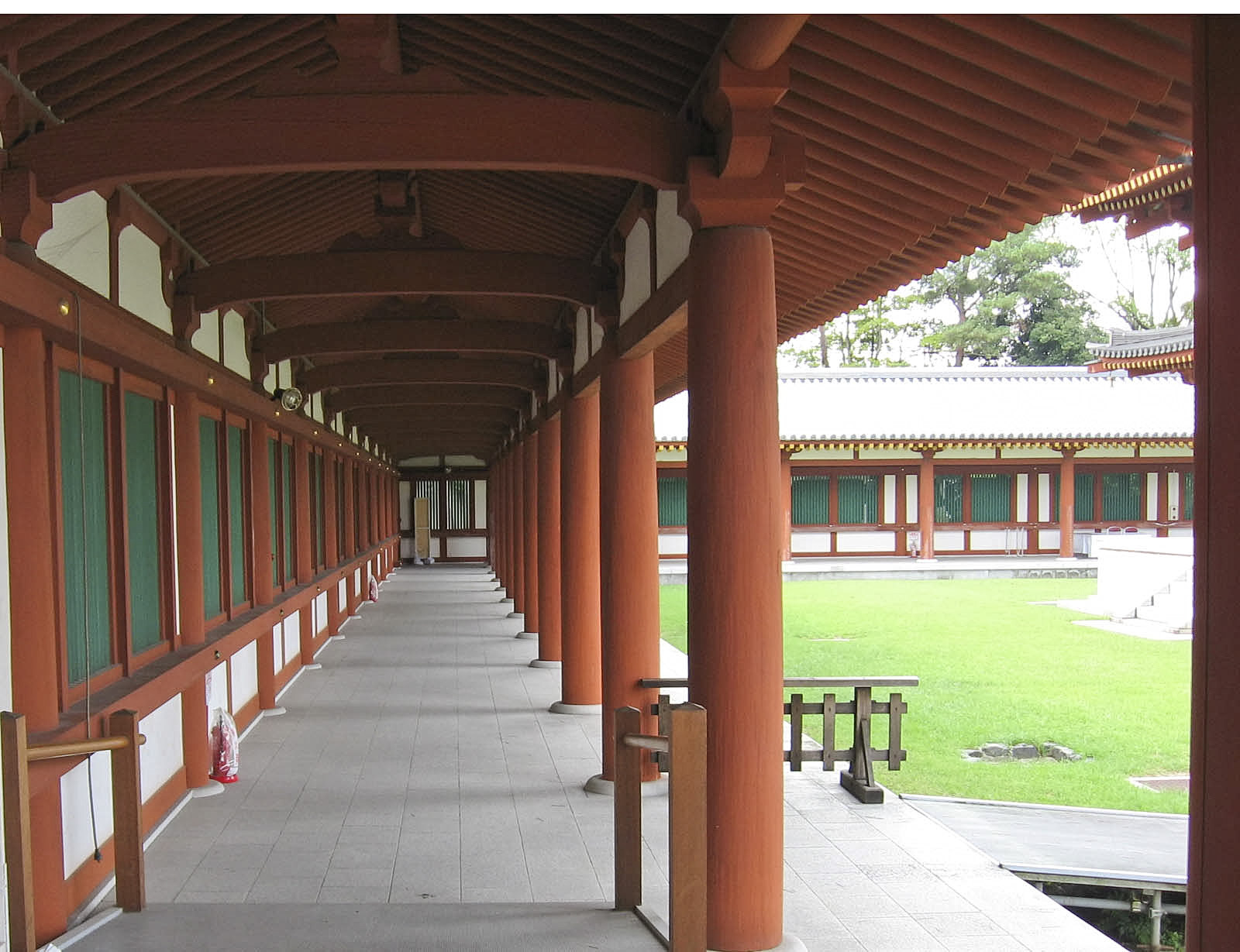
A kairō

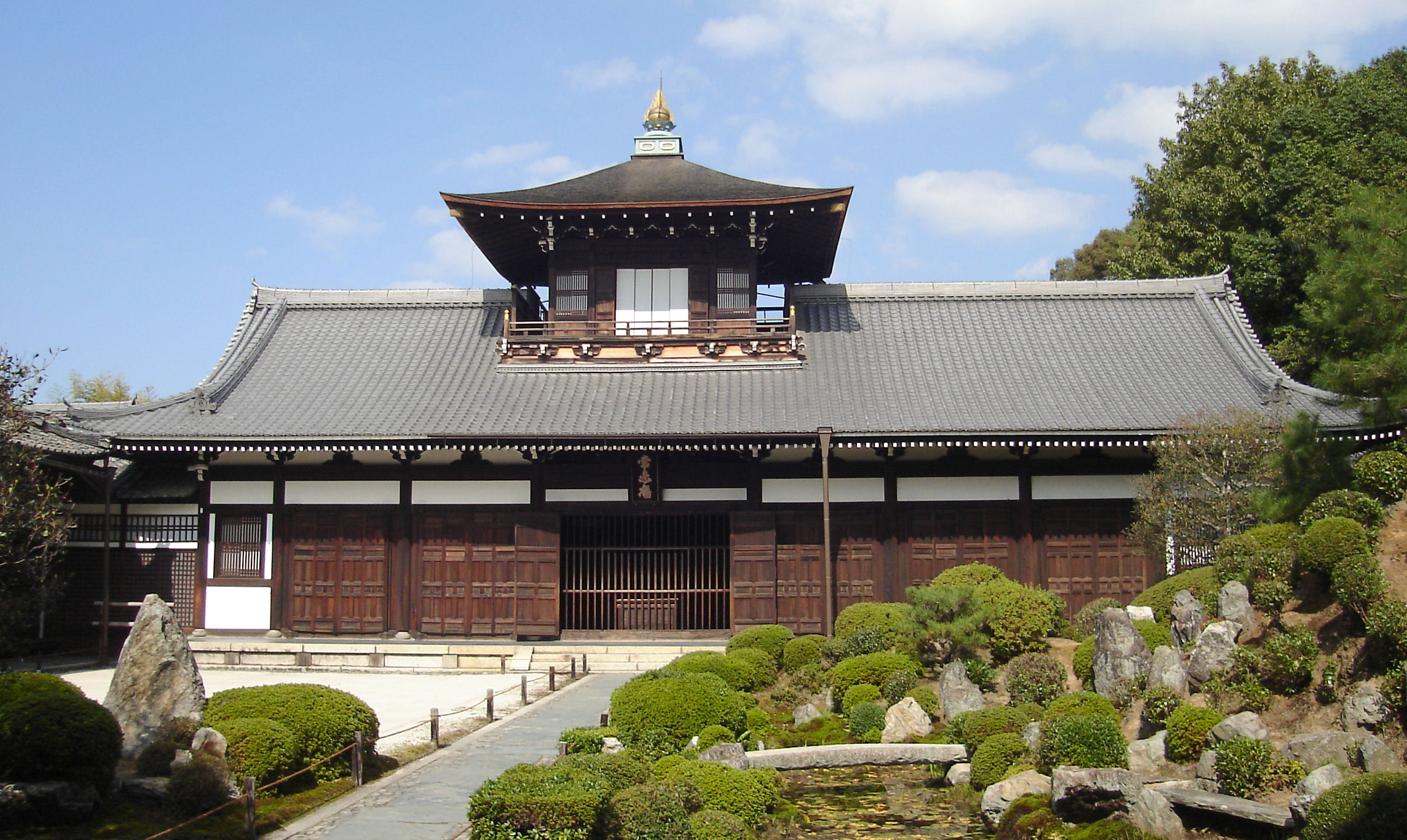
Tōfuku-ji's kaisan-dō

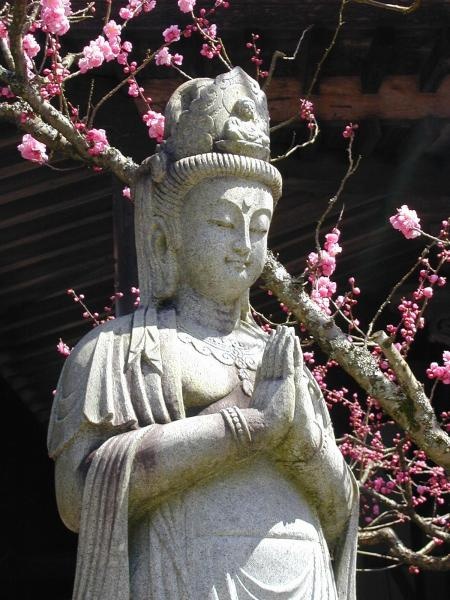
Kannon, goddess of mercy

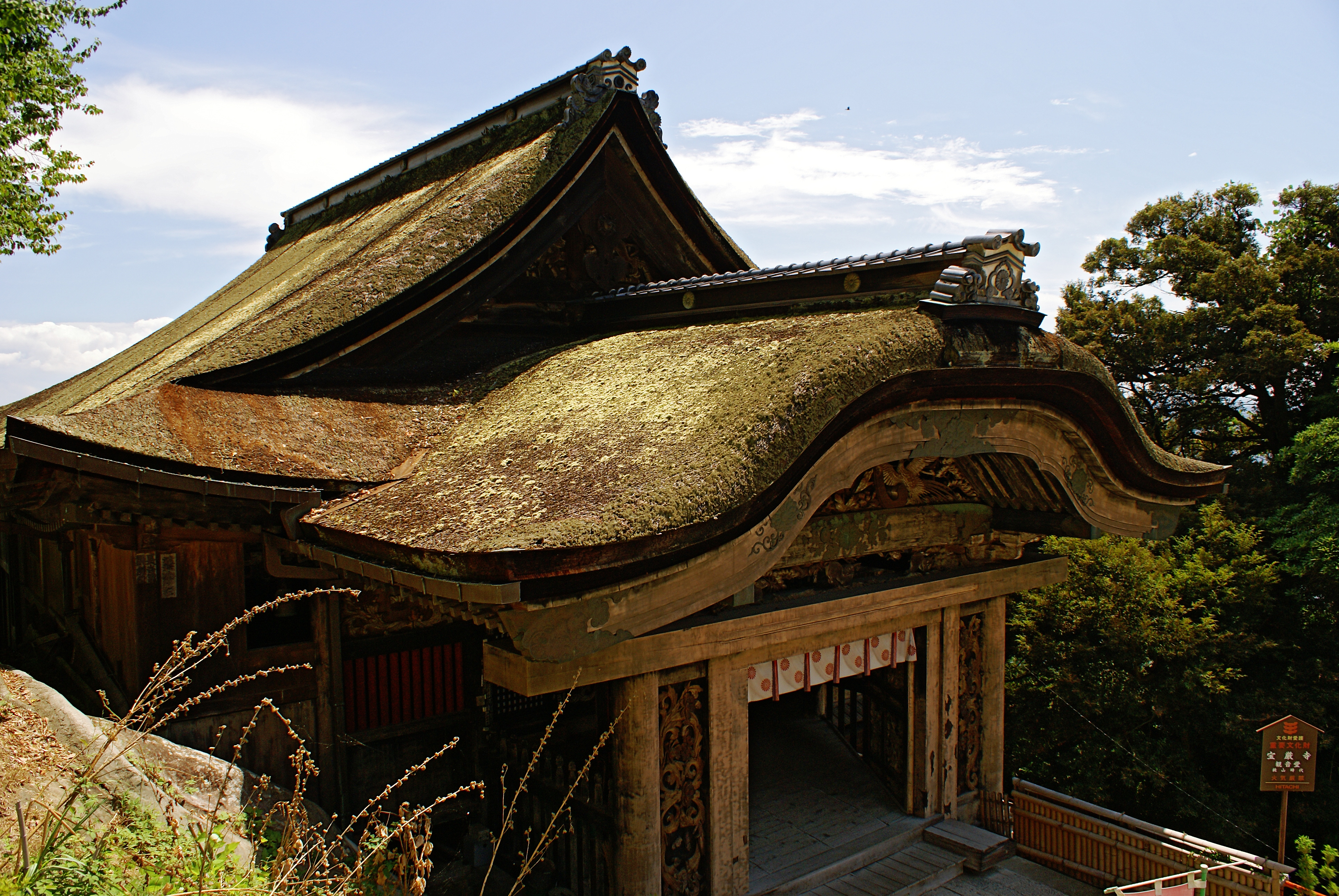
Hōgon-ji's karamon

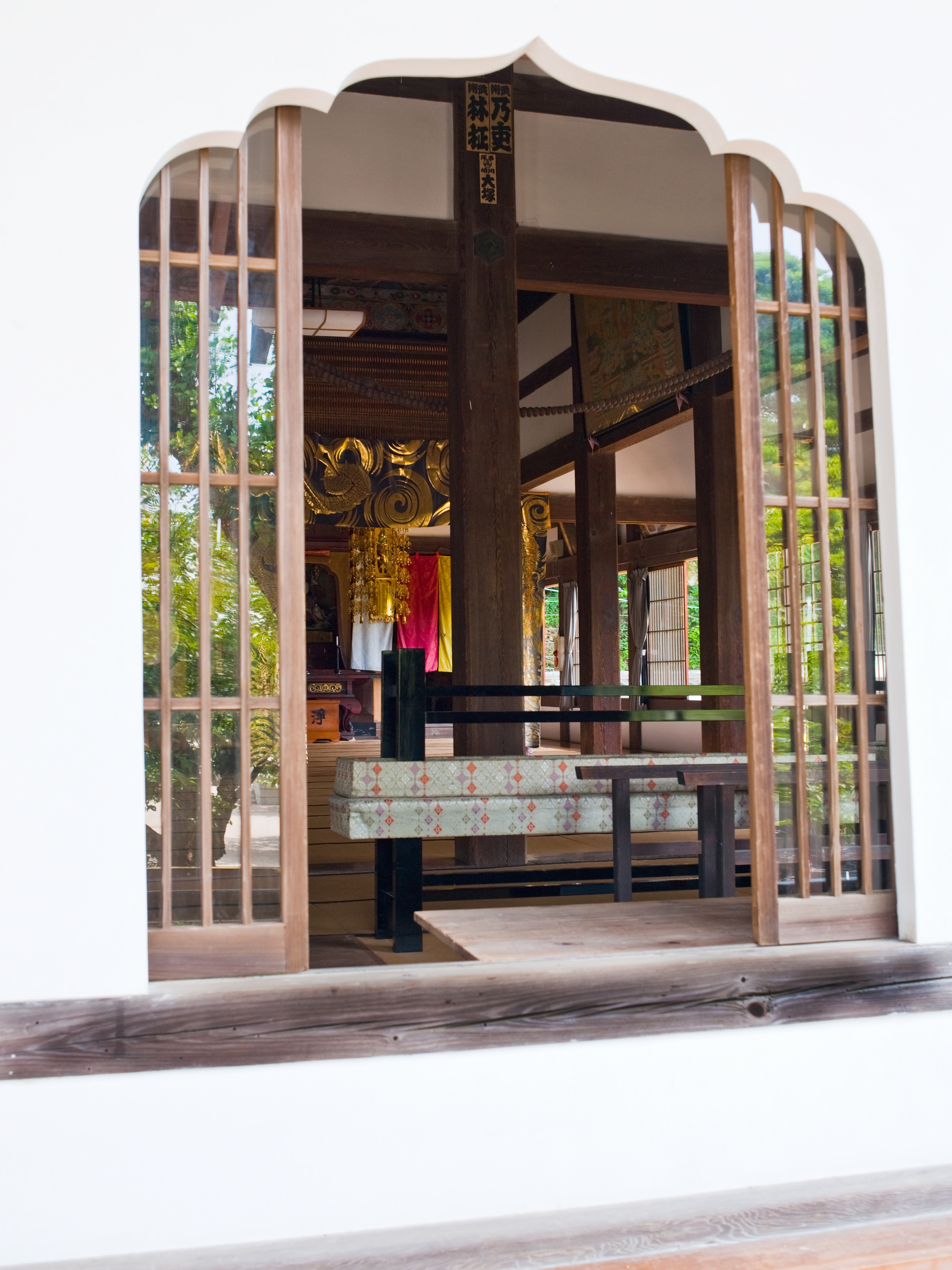
a katōmado

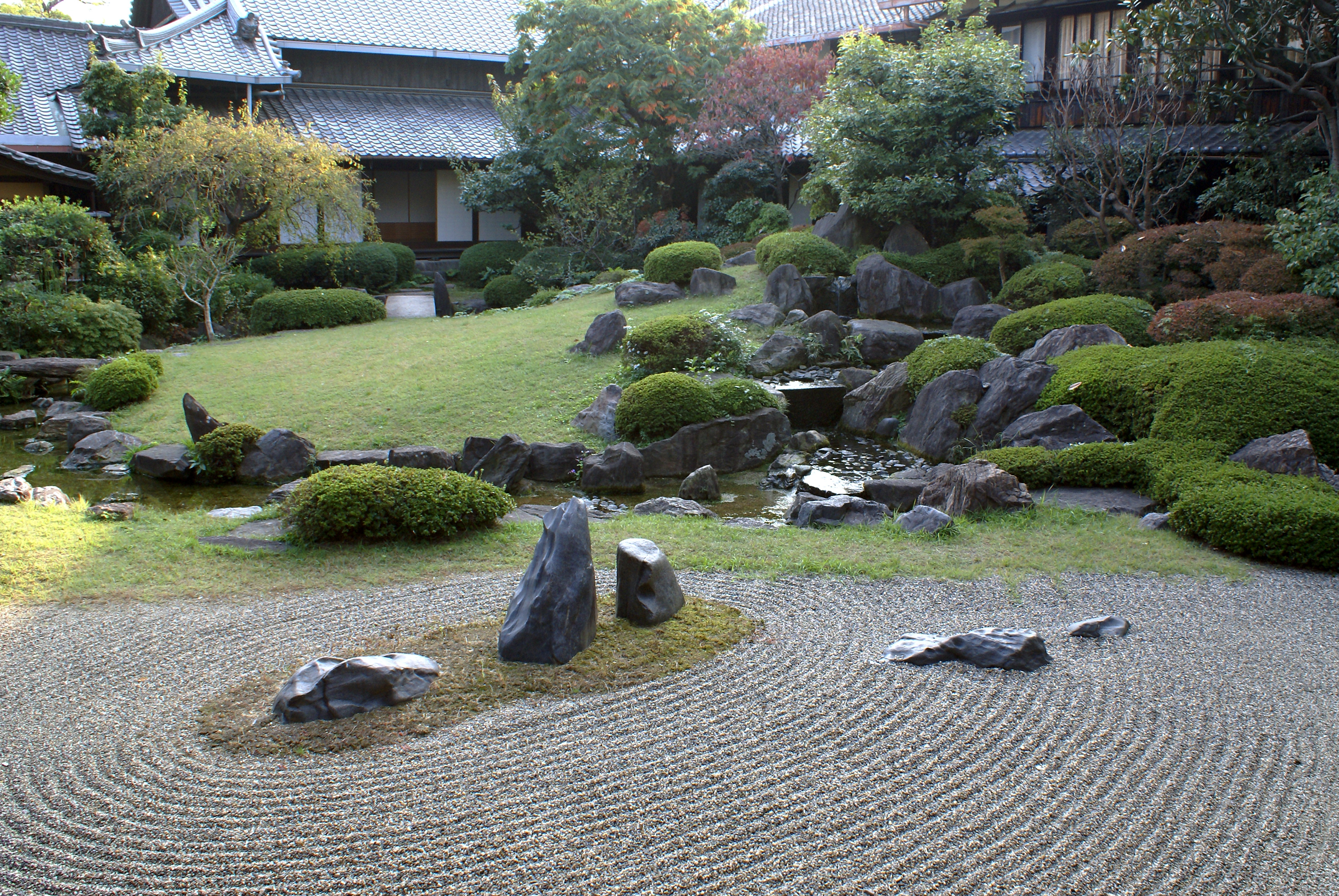
Shitennō-ji's karesansui

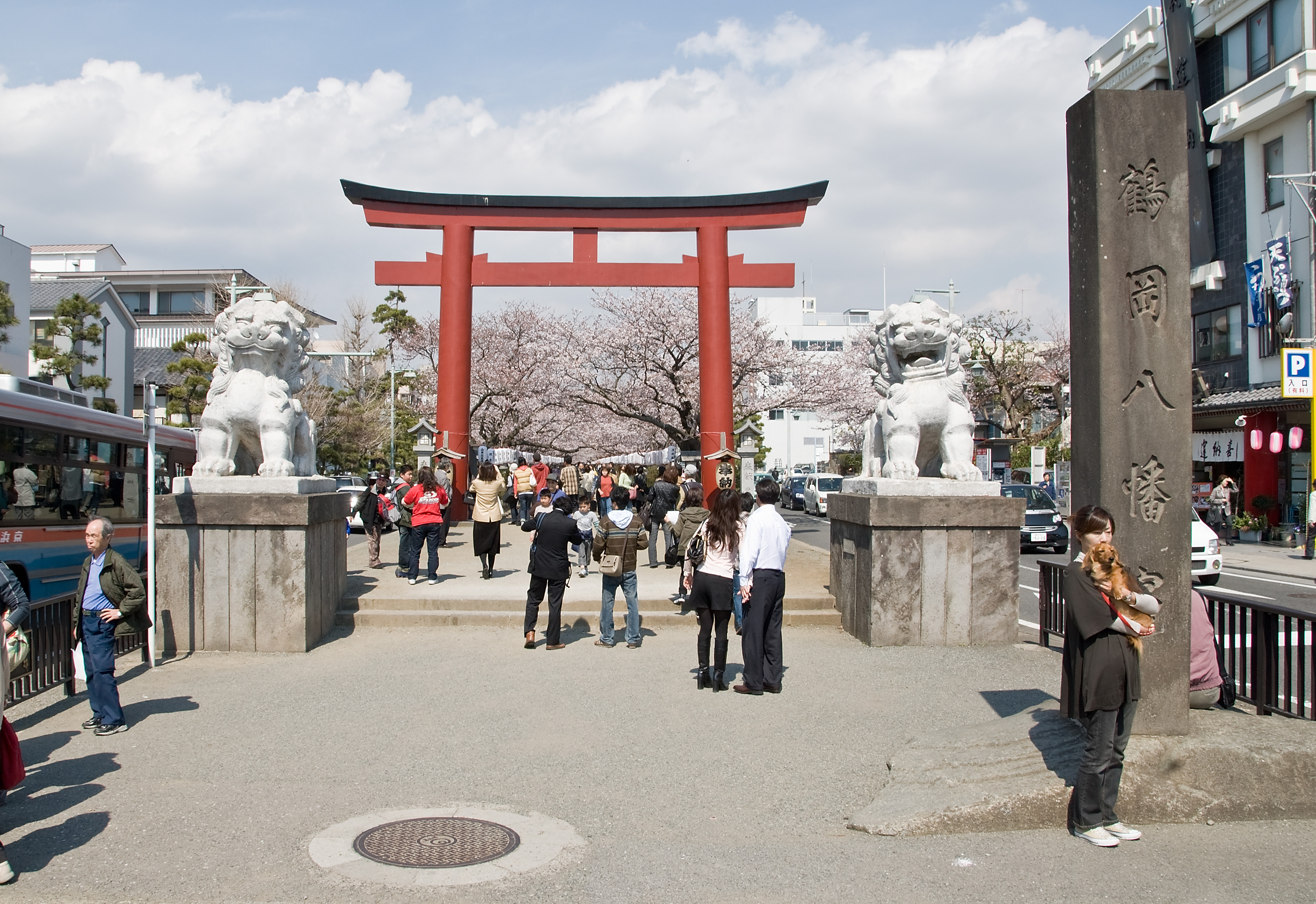
A pair of komainu, one **agyō**, one **ungyō**

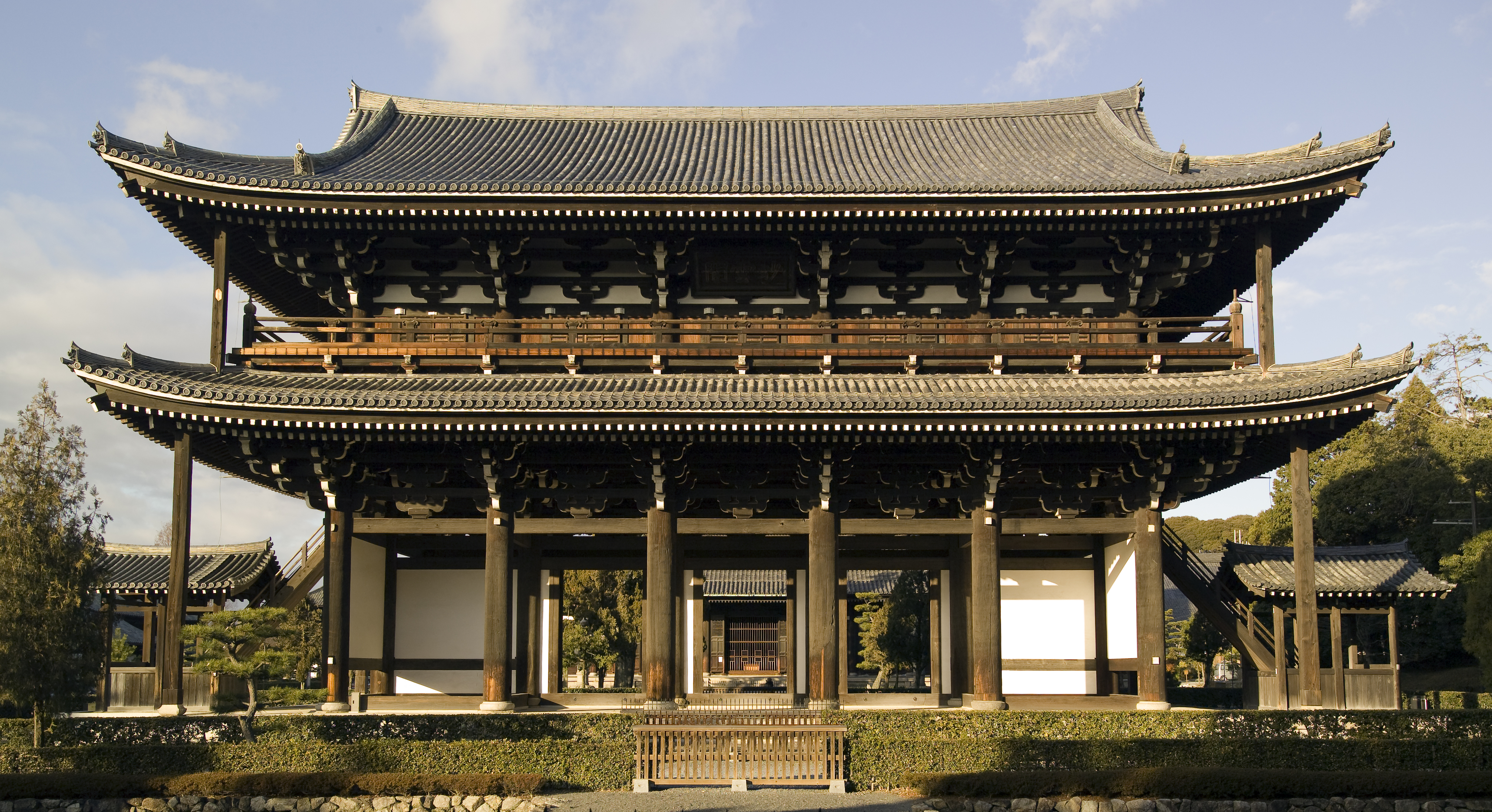
Tōfuku-ji's sanmon is 5 ken wide.

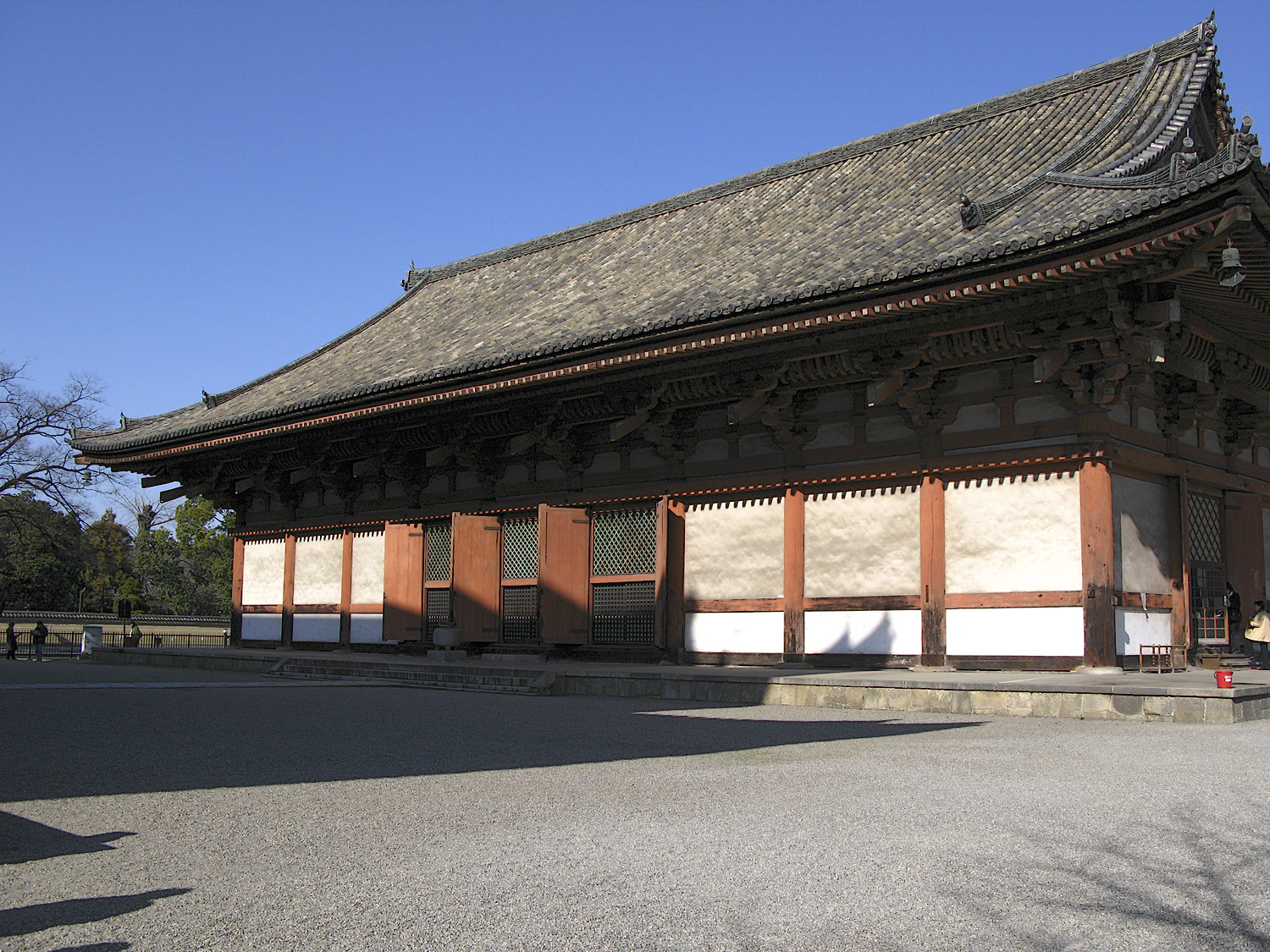
Kō-dō at Tō-ji

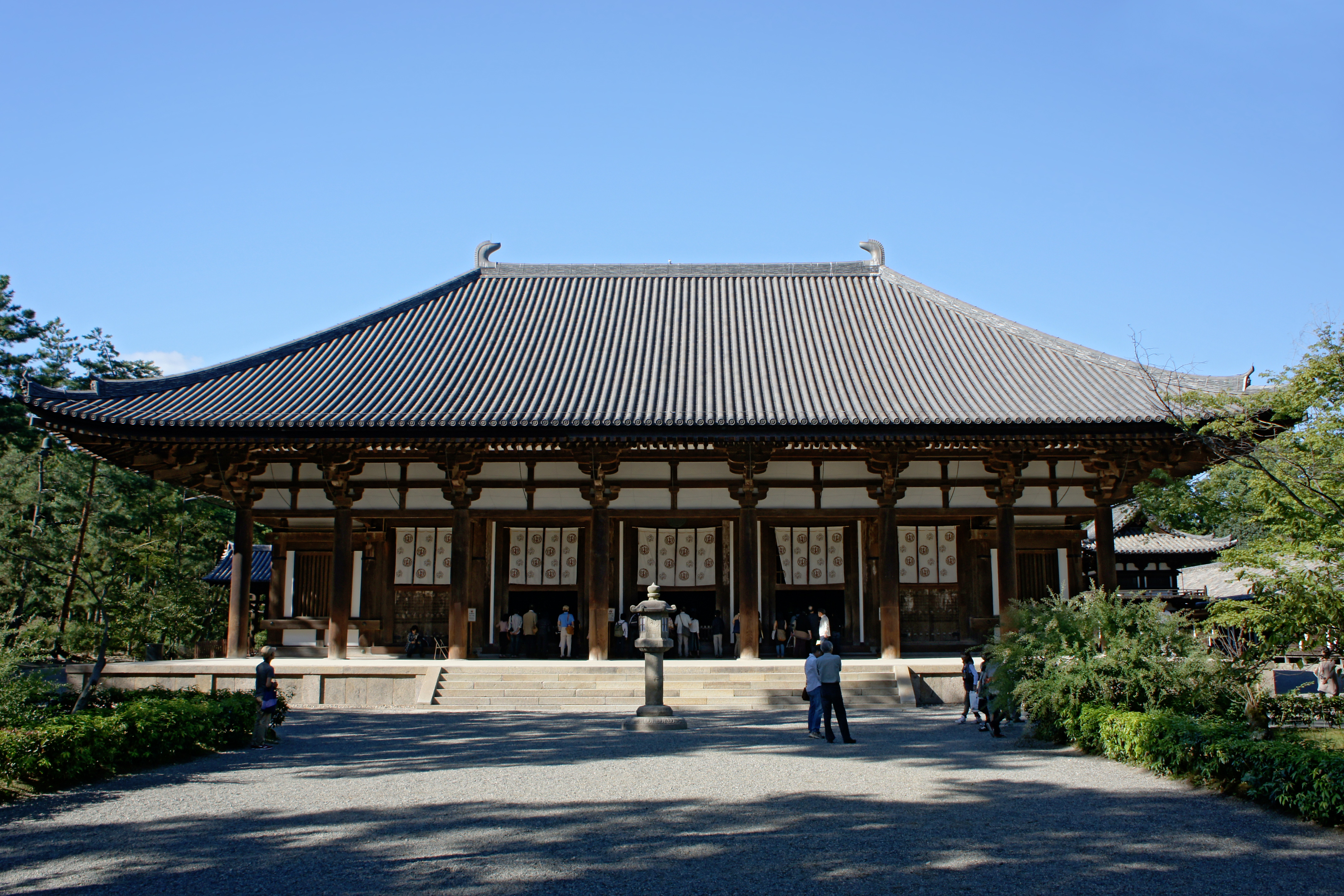
Kon-dō at Tōshōdai-ji

== M ==
- main hall – the building of a temple housing the most important object of worship. See Butsuden or Butsu-dō, hon-dō and kon-dō. Each type possesses specific structural characteristics.
- mandara (曼陀羅) – a mandala, or diagram that contains Buddhist images and illustrates Buddhist cosmology.
- mandara-dō (曼荼羅堂) – lit. "hall of mandalas", but the name is presently used only for Taimadera's Main Hall in Nara.
- manji* (卍）- the Japanese name of the swastika, symbol used for Buddhist temples in Japanese maps.
- mappō - the Degenerate Age of Dharma
- miei-dō* (御影堂) – lit. "image hall". Building housing an image of the temple's founder, equivalent to a Zen sect's **kaisan-dō**.
- mi-dō (御堂) – a generic honorific term for a building which enshrines a sacred statue.
- Miroku Nyorai (弥勒如来) – Japanese name of Maitreya.
- mokugyō* – a large wooden bell used for religious ceremonies.
- mon (門) – a temple's gate, which can be named after its position (nandaimon: lit. "great southern gate"), its structure (nijūmon: "two storied gate"), a deity (Niōmon: lit. "**Nio** gate"), or its use (onarimon: lit. "imperial visit gate", a gate reserved to the Emperor). The same gate can therefore be described using more than one term. For example, a **Niōmon** can at the same time be a **nijūmon**.
- mukaikaramon (向唐門) – See **karamon**.
- myokonin - pious followers of Jōdo Shinshū

== N ==
- naijin (内陣) – the portion of a **hon-dō** (main hall) reserved to the deity, as opposed to the **gejin**, open to worshipers.
- nandaimon* (南大門) – the main southern gate of a temple, in particular that at Nara's Tōdai-ji. See also **mon**.
- Nanto Rokushū (南都六宗) – six Nara period Buddhist sects, namely Sanron (三論), Hossō (法相), Kegon (華厳), Ritsu (律), Kusha (倶舎), and Jōjitsu (成実).
- nijūmon* (二重門) – a two-storied gate with a roof surrounding the first floor. See also **mon**.
- Nembutsu (念仏 or ねんぶつ) commonly seen in Pure Land Buddhism. In the context of Pure Land practice, it generally refers to the repetition of the name of Amitābha. It is a translation of Sanskrit buddhānusmṛti (or, "recollection of the Buddha")
- Niō* (仁王 or 二王) – two muscular guardians standing at the sides of a gate to ward off evils spirits, one (**Agyō**) with its mouth open to pronounce the sound "a", first letter of the Sanskrit alphabet and symbol of the beginning of all things, one (**Ungyō**) with its mouth closed to pronounce the sound "un", last letter of the Sanskrit alphabet and symbol of the end of all things.
- Niōmon* (仁王門 or 二王門) – a two-storied or high gate guarded by two wooden guardians called **Niō**. See also **mon**.
- noborirō (登廊) – a covered stairway at Nara's Hasedera.
- Nyorai (如来) – Japanese term for **tathagata**. Someone who has reached enlightenment. The most important Nyorai in Japan are **Amida**, **Yakushi**, **Miroku**, and **Dainichi**.

== O ==
- Obon* (お盆) – three-day festival to honor one's ancestors.
- Okyō (お経) – see **sūtra**.
- Onigawara (鬼瓦) – lit. "ogre tile". A special tile carrying the face of an ogre installed at the corners of a temple's roof, originally to protect it from evil influences, nowadays as a decoration. There may not be an ogre's face.
- Oizuru (garment)

== Gallery: L to O ==
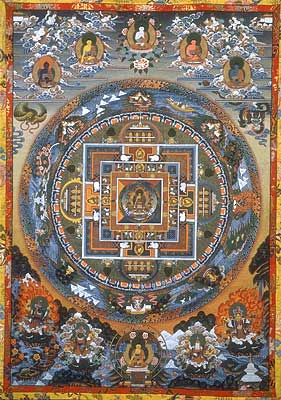
A mandara

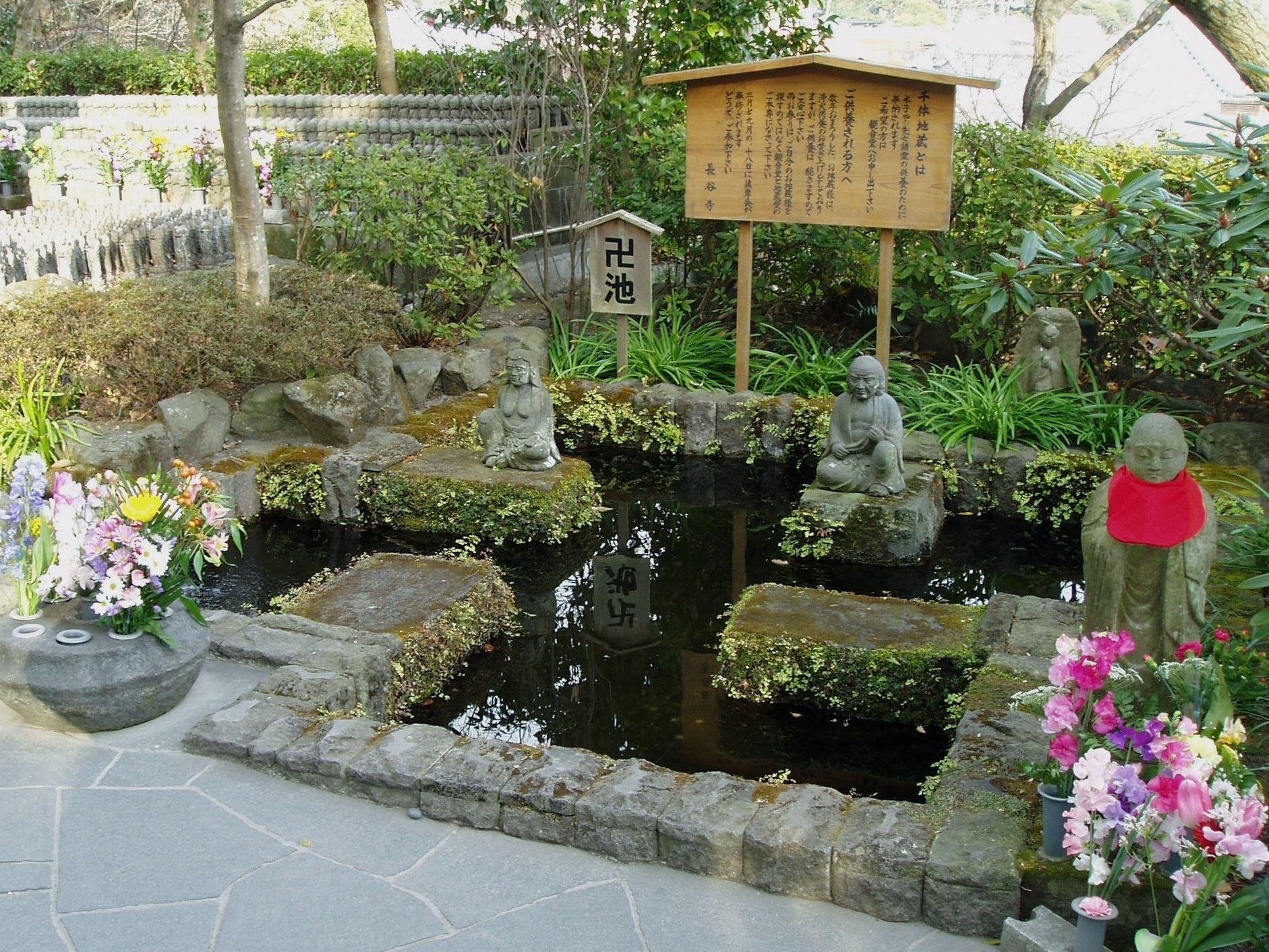
A manji-shaped pond at a Buddhist temple

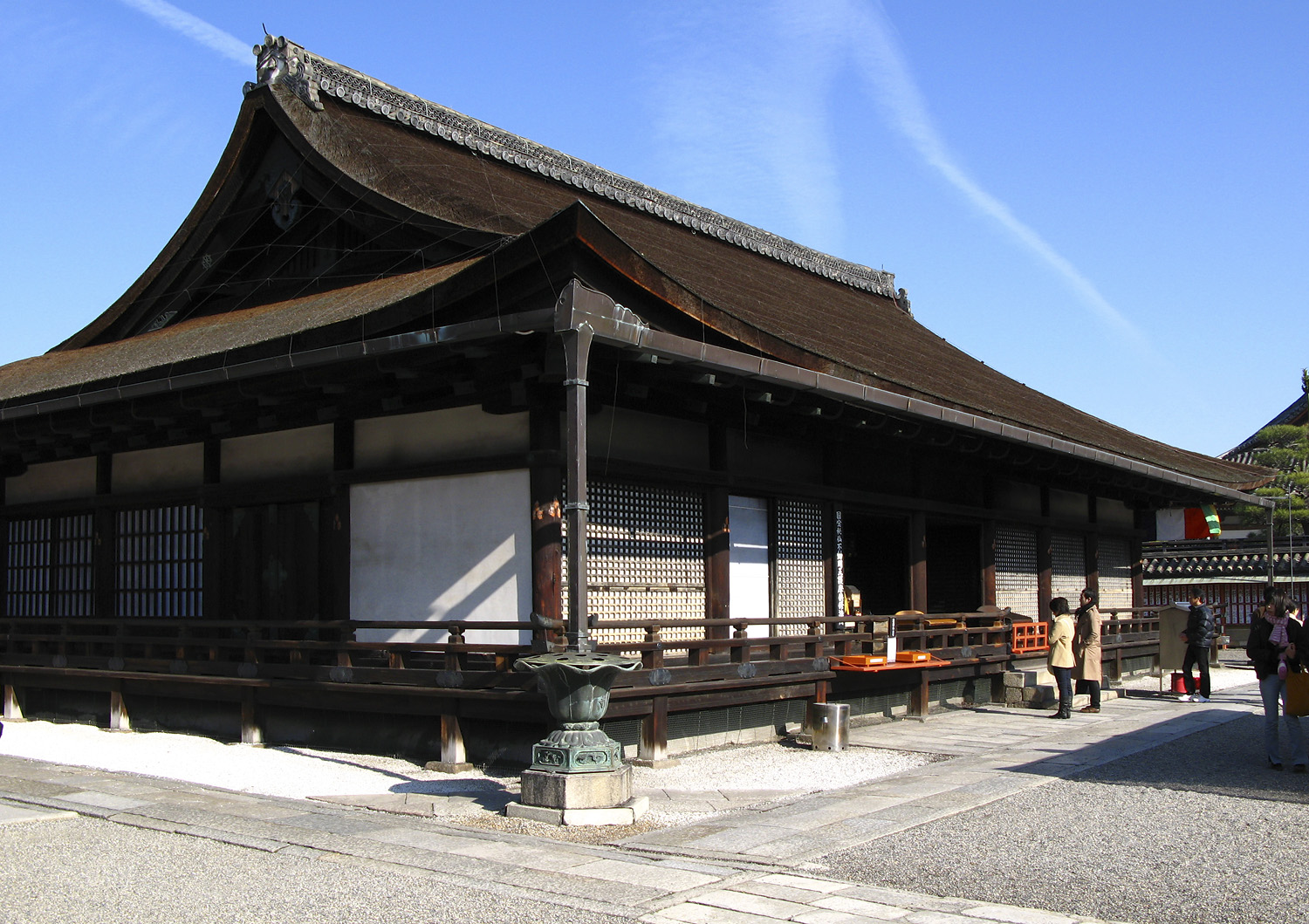
Miei-dō at Tō-ji

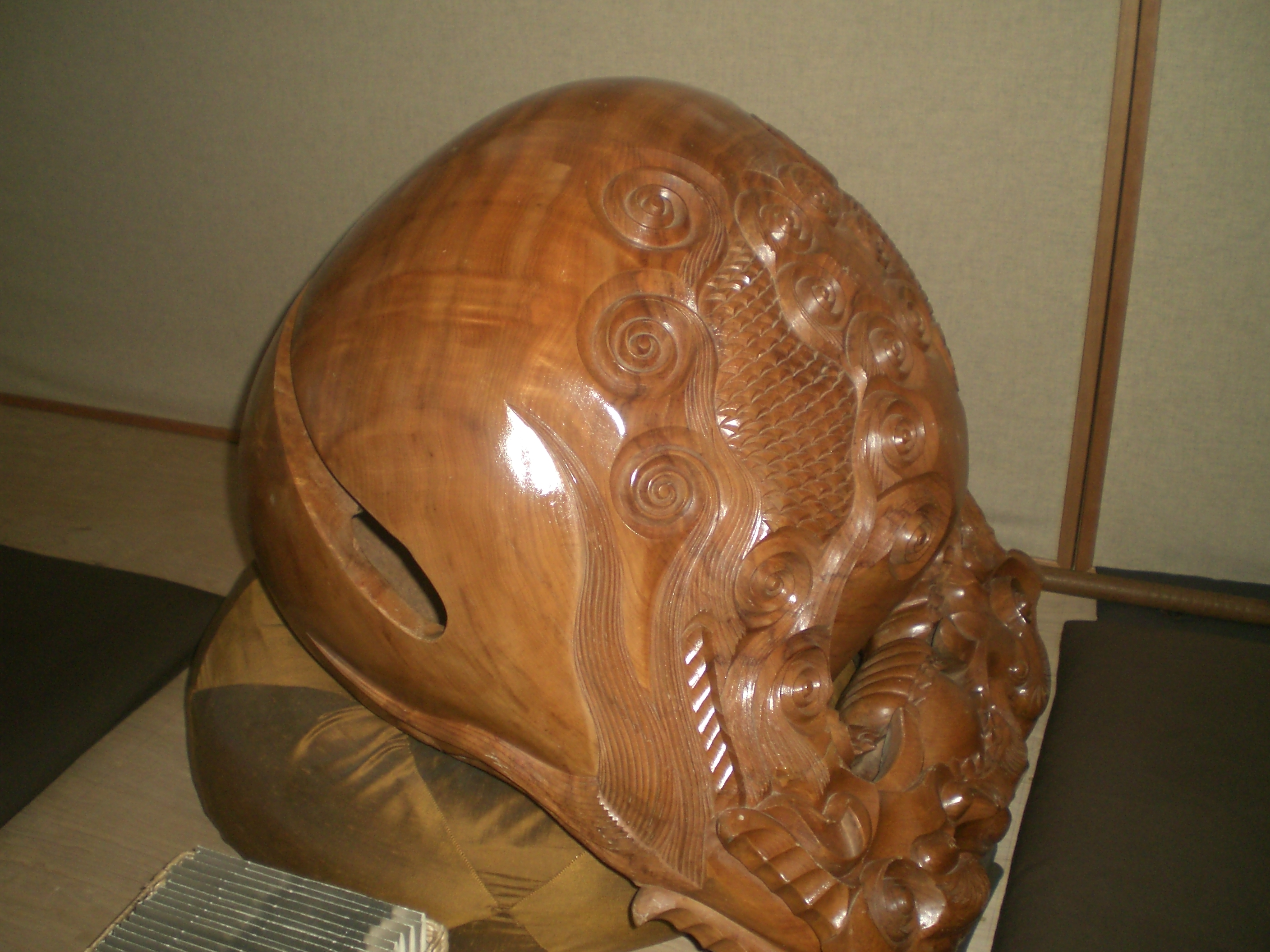
A mokugyo

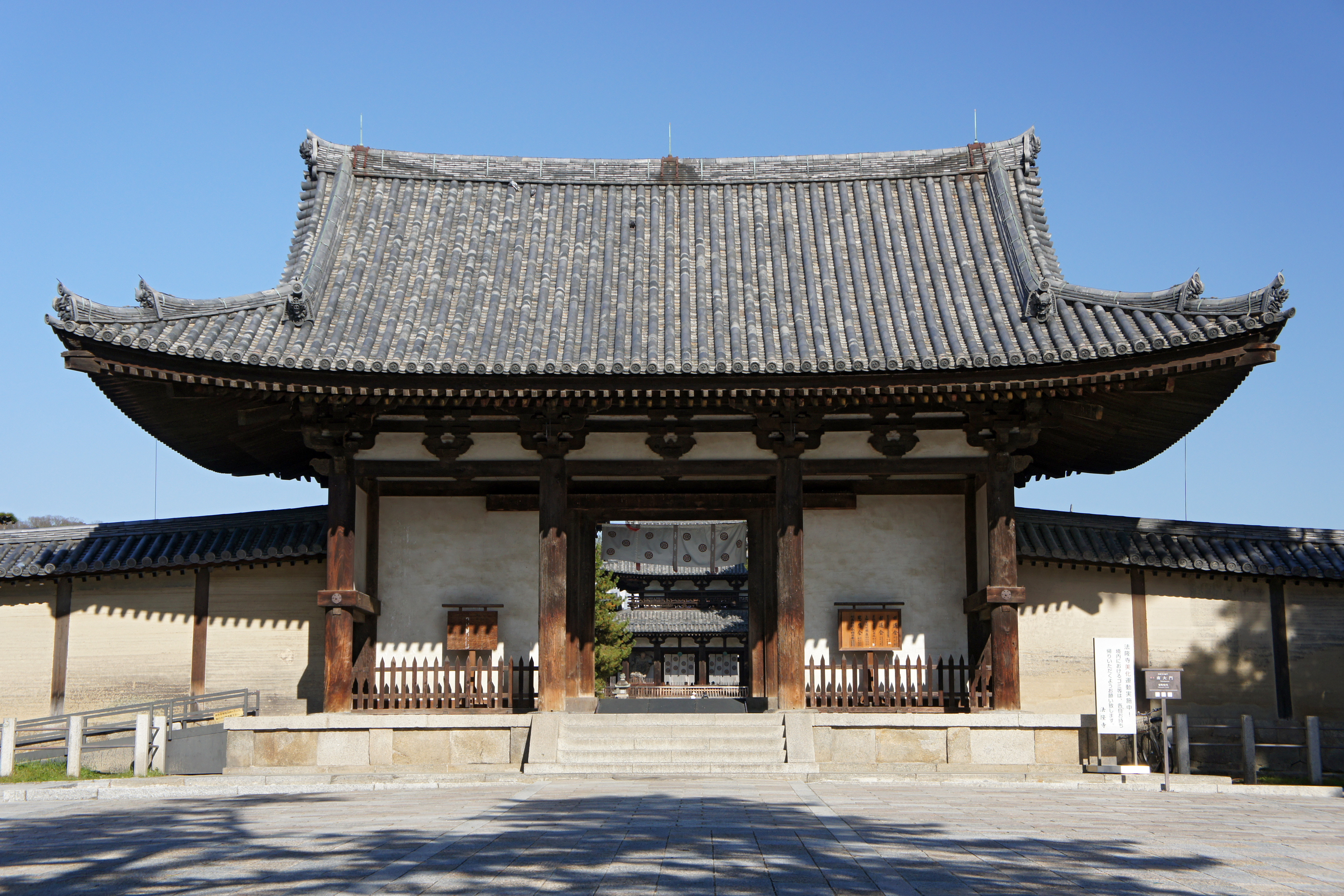
Nandaimon at Hōryū-ji

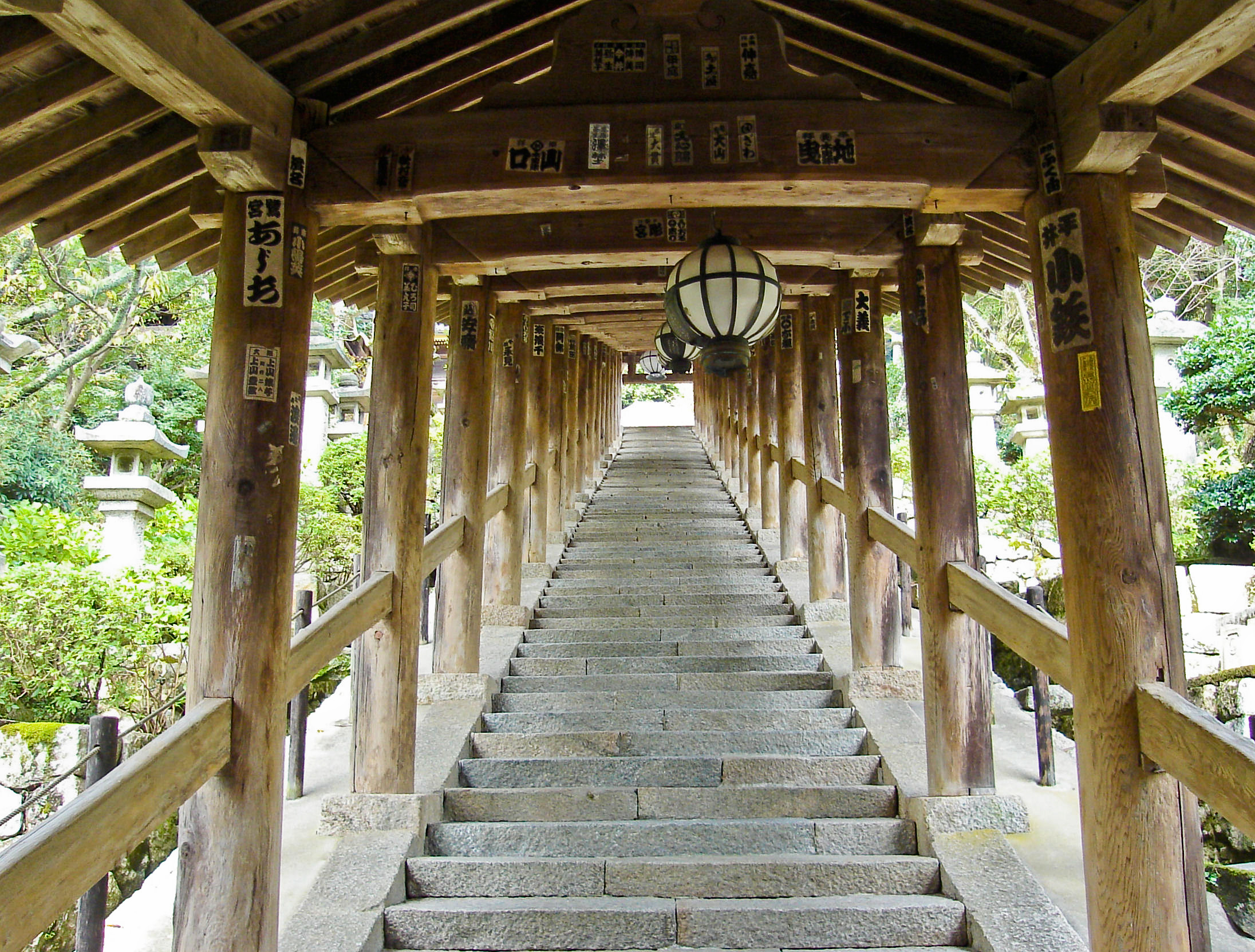
The noborirō at Nara's Hase-dera

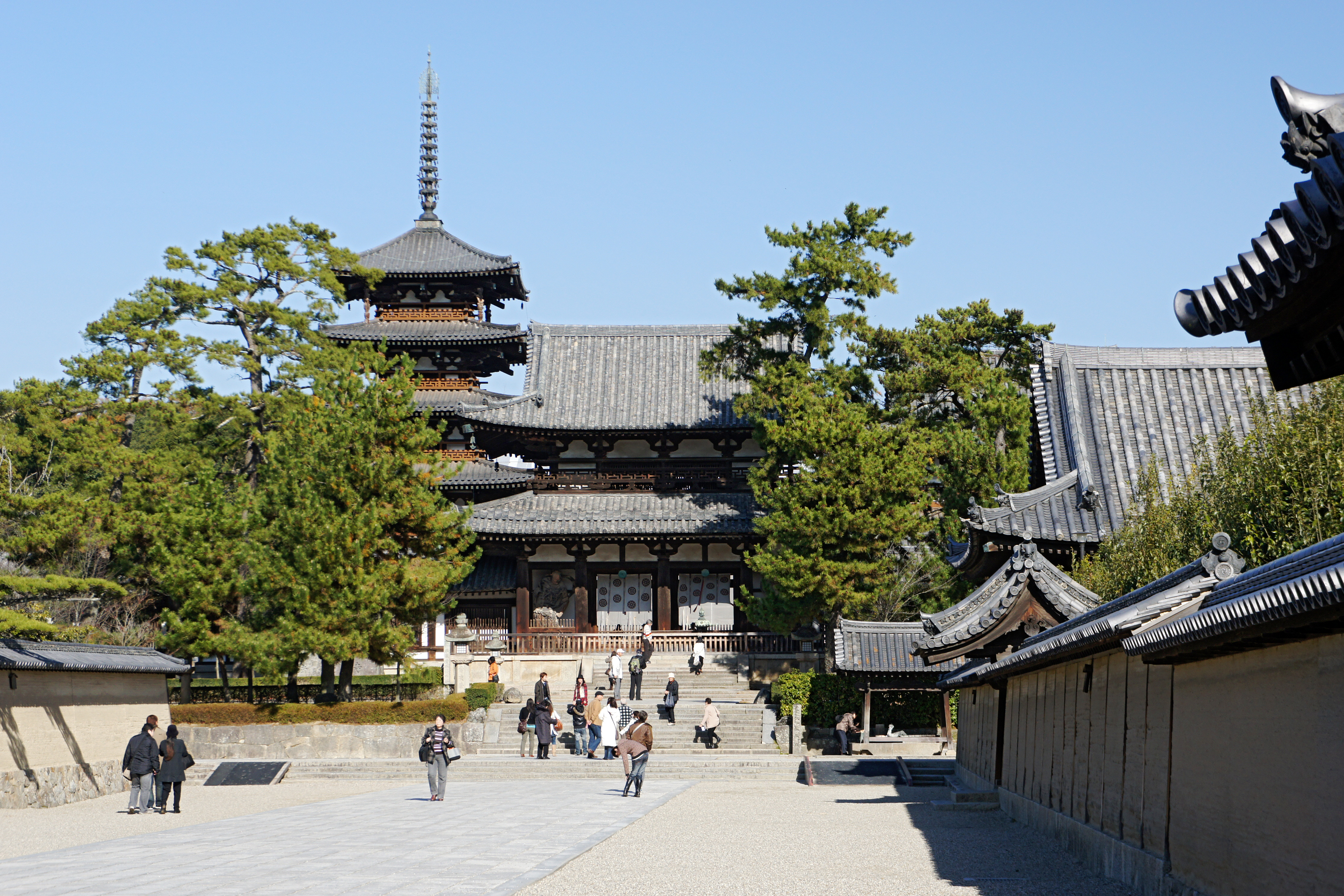
Nijūmon at Hōryū-ji.

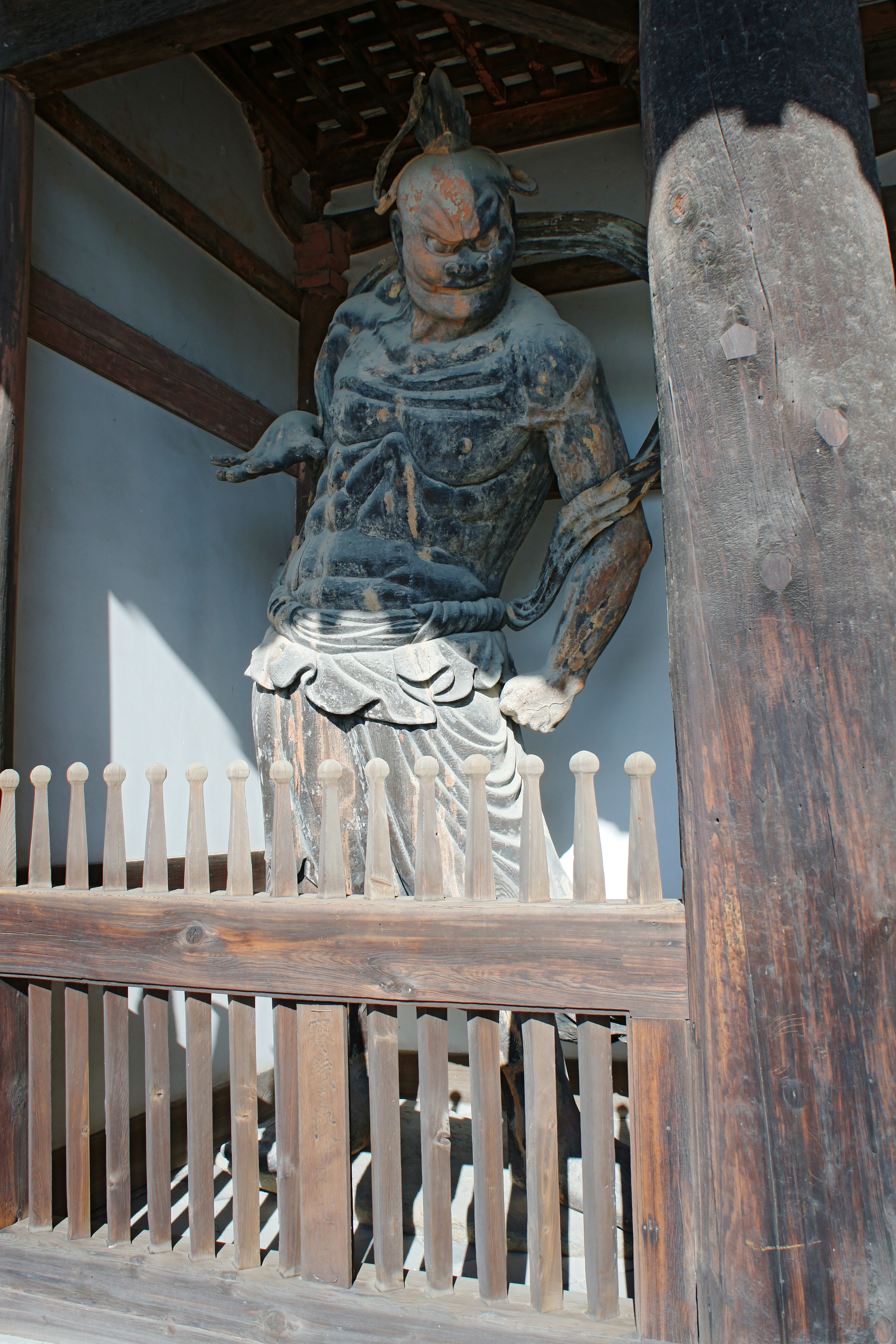
A Niō at Hōryū-ji

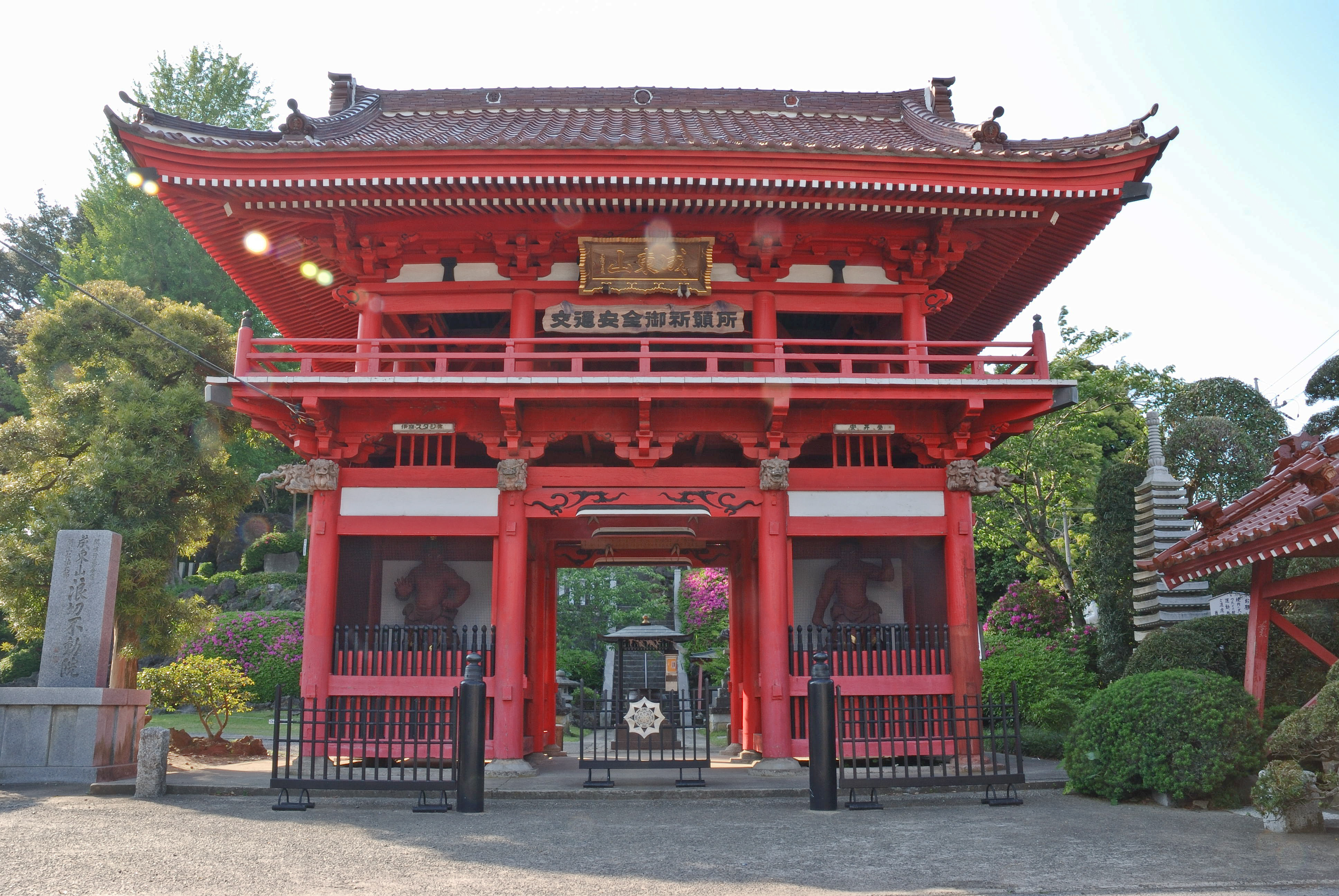
A niōmon

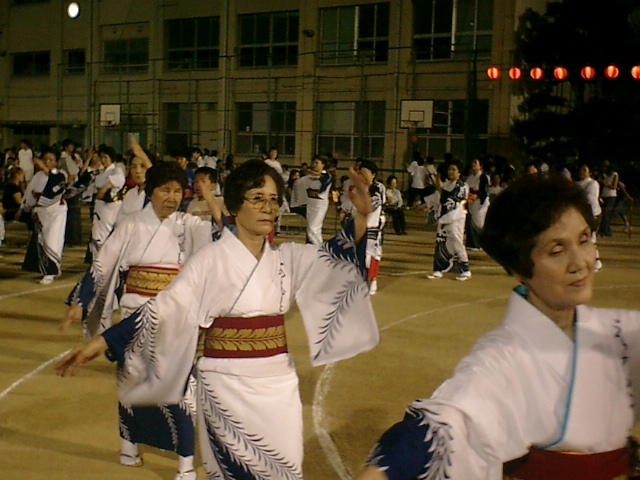
Dancers at Obon

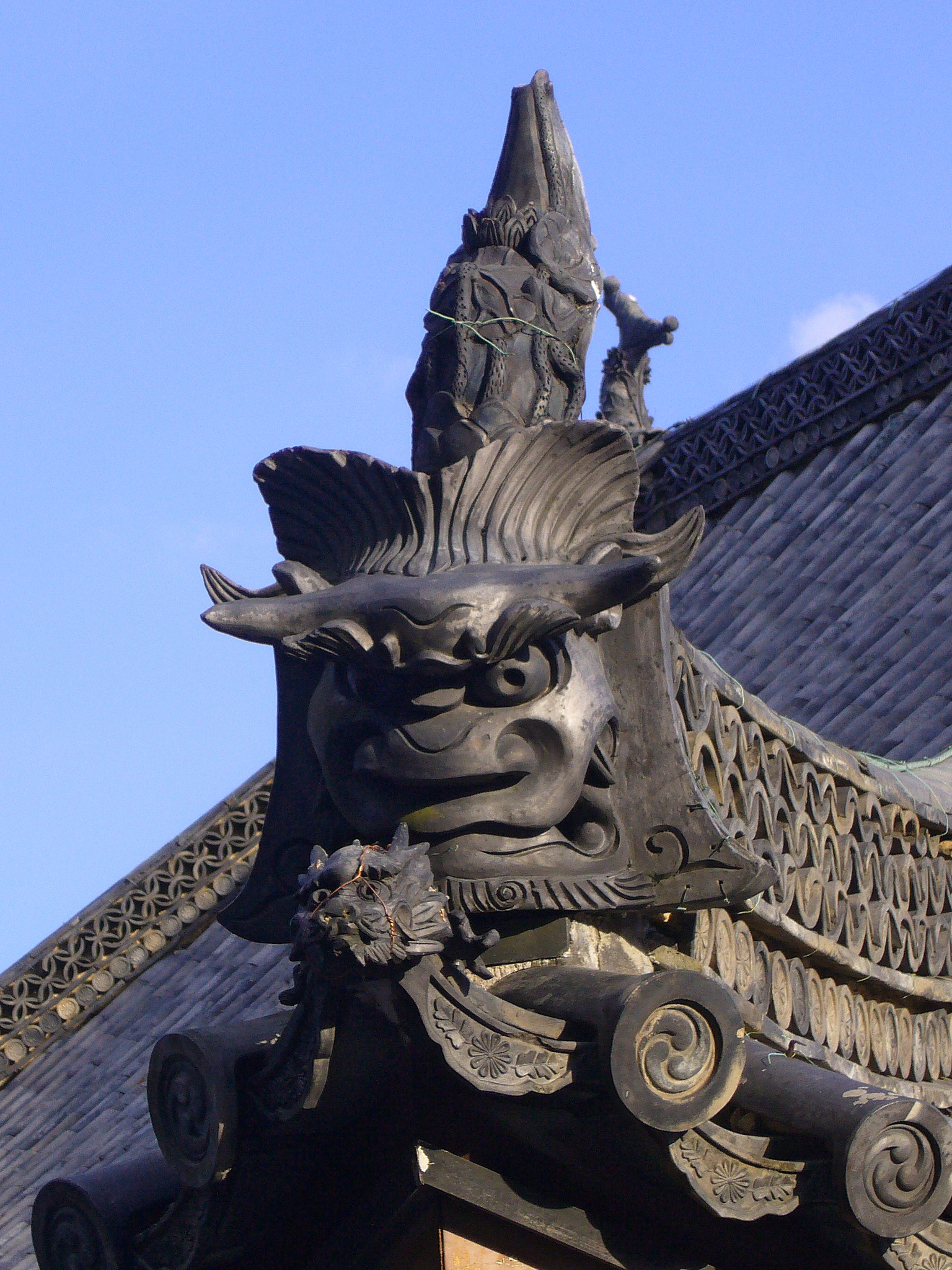
Onigawara

== P ==
- pagoda* – see **stupa** and tō.
- Posthumous name – see **kaimyō**.

== R ==
- Rakan (羅漢, lit. "Silk Man") – An Arhat, a Buddhist saint. See also **arakan**.
- rokujizō* (六地蔵) – series of six different statues of god **Jizō**, often found along roads, where each is in charge of helping the beings of one of six worlds (of the Deva (天上), Ashura (阿修羅)，human beings (人間), hell (地獄), humans reincarnated as animals (畜生), and hungry spirits (餓鬼)).
- Rōmon (楼門) – a high gate with two floors, only one of which has usable space, surrounded by a balcony and topped by a roof.
- Rokuyō (六曜), the six-day week of the Buddhist calendar.

== S ==
- saisen-bako* (賽銭箱) – a box collecting the offerings (saisen) from worshipers, usually situated in front of an object of worship or a hall at temples and **shrine**s.
- sai-dō (斎堂) – the refectory at a Zen temple or monastery. See also **jiki-dō**.
- sandō* (参道)- the approach leading from a **torii** to a **shrine**. The term is also used sometimes at Buddhist temples too.
- sangō (山号) – the so-called "mountain name" of a temple, always ending in "mount" (山), read -zan (e.g. "Tōei**zan** Kan'ei-ji Endon'in") or -san. The other two are, in order, the **jigō** and the **ingō**. The use of the sangō came into fashion after the arrival of Zen Buddhism to Japan, therefore not all temples have one.
- san-in-jigō (山院寺号) – a temple's full name.
- sanmon* (三門 or 山門) – the gate in front of the **butsuden**. The name is short for Sangedatsumon (三解脱門), lit. Gate of the three liberations. Its three openings (kūmon (空門), musōmon (無相門) and muganmon (無願門)) symbolize the three gates to enlightenment. Entering, one can free himself from three passions (貪 ton, or greed, 瞋 shin, or hatred, and 癡 chi, or "foolishness"). See also **mon**. Its size depends on the temple's rank. (See photos.)
- sanrō* (山廊) – small buildings at the ends of a two-storied Zen gate containing the stairs to the second story.
- satori (悟り) – lit. "understanding". Japanese term for Buddhist enlightenment.
- Segaki (施餓鬼, lit. "Feeding/Appeasing the Hungry Ghost") – A ritual of Japanese Buddhism, traditionally performed to stop the suffering of the Gaki (餓鬼, lit. "Hungry Ghosts"), Jikininki (食人鬼, lit. "Man-eating Ghost/Oni") and Muenbotoke (無縁仏, lit. "Without Buddha")—the spirit of a departed mortal human with no living connections amongst the living; the dead who have no living relatives—ghosts tormented by insatiable 'hunger'. Alternatively, the ritual may be performed so-as to force them to return to their portion of hell, or-else keeps the spirits of the dead from falling into the realm of the Gaki in the first place. The Segaki may be performed at any time, but it is traditionally performed as part of the yearly Ō-Bon Festival services in July to remember the dead and the Segaki ritual for offering alms to specifically Gaki &/or Muenbotoke, but not for the spirits of one's ancestor.
- seisatsu*(制札) – a signboard containing announcements and rules for worshipers.
- sekitō (石塔) – a stone **pagoda** (**stupa**). See also **tō**
- Senbi Kannon (千臂観音) – See **Senju Kannon**.
- Senju Kannon (千手観音) – the thousand-armed Goddess of Mercy. As a symbol of her mercy, the deity has also a thousand eyes (not present in statues for practical reasons) and is consequently often called Senju Sengen Kanjizai Bosatsu (千手千眼観自在菩薩) or simply Senju Sengen Kannon (千手千眼観音, thousand-armed, thousand-eyed Kannon).
- Shaka Nyorai – Japanese name of Shakyamuni, or Gautama Buddha.
- Shaka Sanzon (釈迦三尊) – the Shakyamuni Trinity, three statues representing Gautama **Buddha** "**Shakyamuni**" flanked by two other deities, which can be either Monju Bosatsu and Fugen Bosatsu or another pair.
- shichidō garan* (七堂伽藍) – a double compound term literally meaning "seven halls" (七堂) and "(temple) buildings" (伽藍). What is counted in the group of seven buildings, or shichidō, can vary greatly from temple to temple and from school to school. In practice, shichidō garan can also mean simply a large complex.
  - **Nanto Rokushū** and later non-Zen schools: The **shichidō garan** in this case includes a **kon-dō**, a **tō**, a **kō-dō**, a **shōrō**, a **jiki-dō**, a **sōbō**, and a **kyōzō**.
  - Zen schools: A Zen **shichidō garan** includes a **butsuden** or **butsu-dō**, a **hattō**, a **ku'in**, a **sō-dō**, a **sanmon**, a **tōsu** and a **yokushitsu**.
- shimenawa* (標縄・注連縄・七五三縄) – lit. "enclosing rope". A length of braided rice straw rope used for ritual purification often found at temples too.
- shinbutsu bunri (神仏分離) – the forbidding by law of the syncretism of Shinto and Buddhism, and the effort to create a clear division between Shinto and Buddhism on one side, and Buddhist temples and Shinto **shrine**s on the other.
- shinbutsu kakuri (神仏隔離) − the tendency in medieval and early modern Japan to keep particular kami separate from any form or manifestation of Buddhism.
- shinbutsu shūgō (神仏習合) – syncretism of Buddhism and local religious beliefs, the normal state of things before the **shinbutsu bunri**.
- Shinjin (信心) - true entrusting, shin (信) to mean truth, reality, sincerity; jin (心) means mind
- Shi Tennō* (四天王) – the Four Heavenly Kings are the statues of four protector gods (the Deva Kings).
- shoin (書院) – originally a study and a place for lectures on the **sutra** within a temple, later the term came to mean just a study.
- shōrō (鐘楼)* – a temple's belfry, a building from which a bell is hung.
- Sixteen Arhats – See **Jūroku Rakan**.
- sōbō (僧坊)* – The monks' living quarters in a non-Zen garan
- sō-dō* (僧堂) – Lit. "monk hall". A building dedicated to the practice of **Zazen**. It used to be dedicated to all kinds of activities, from eating to sleeping, centered on zazen.
- sōmon* (総門) – the gate at the entrance of a temple. It precedes the bigger and more important **sanmon**. See also **mon**.
- sōrin* (相輪) – a spire reaching up from the center of the roof of some temple halls, tiered like a **pagoda**.
- sotoba* or sotōba (卒塔婆) – transliteration of the Sanskrit **stupa**.
  - A **pagoda**. Tower with an odd number of tiers (three, five, seven nine, or thirteen). See also **stupa**.
  - Strips of wood left behind tombs during annual ceremonies (**tsuizen**) symbolizing a **stupa**. The upper part is segmented like a **pagoda** and carries Sanskrit inscriptions, **sutras**, and the **kaimyō** (posthumous name) of the deceased.

In present-day Japanese, sotoba usually has the latter meaning.

- stupa – in origin a vessel for Buddha's relics, later also a receptacle for scriptures and other relics. Its shape changed in the Far East under the influence of the Chinese watchtower to form tower-like structures like the **buttō**, the **gorintō**, the **hōkyōintō**, the **sekitō**, the **tō**, or the much simpler wooden stick-style **sotoba**.
- sūtra – the sacred scriptures of Buddhism.

== Gallery: P to S ==
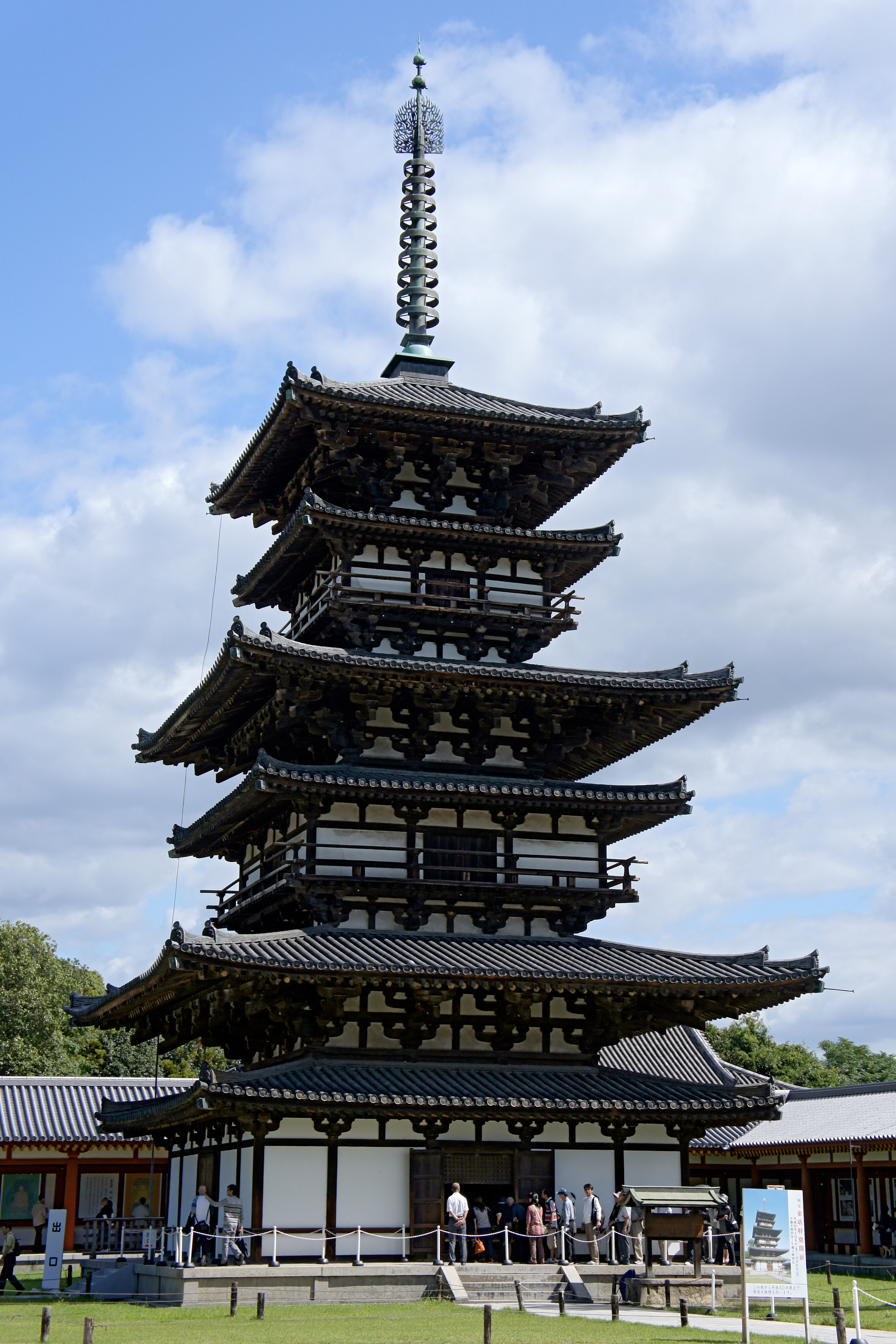
Pagoda at Yakushi-ji in Nara

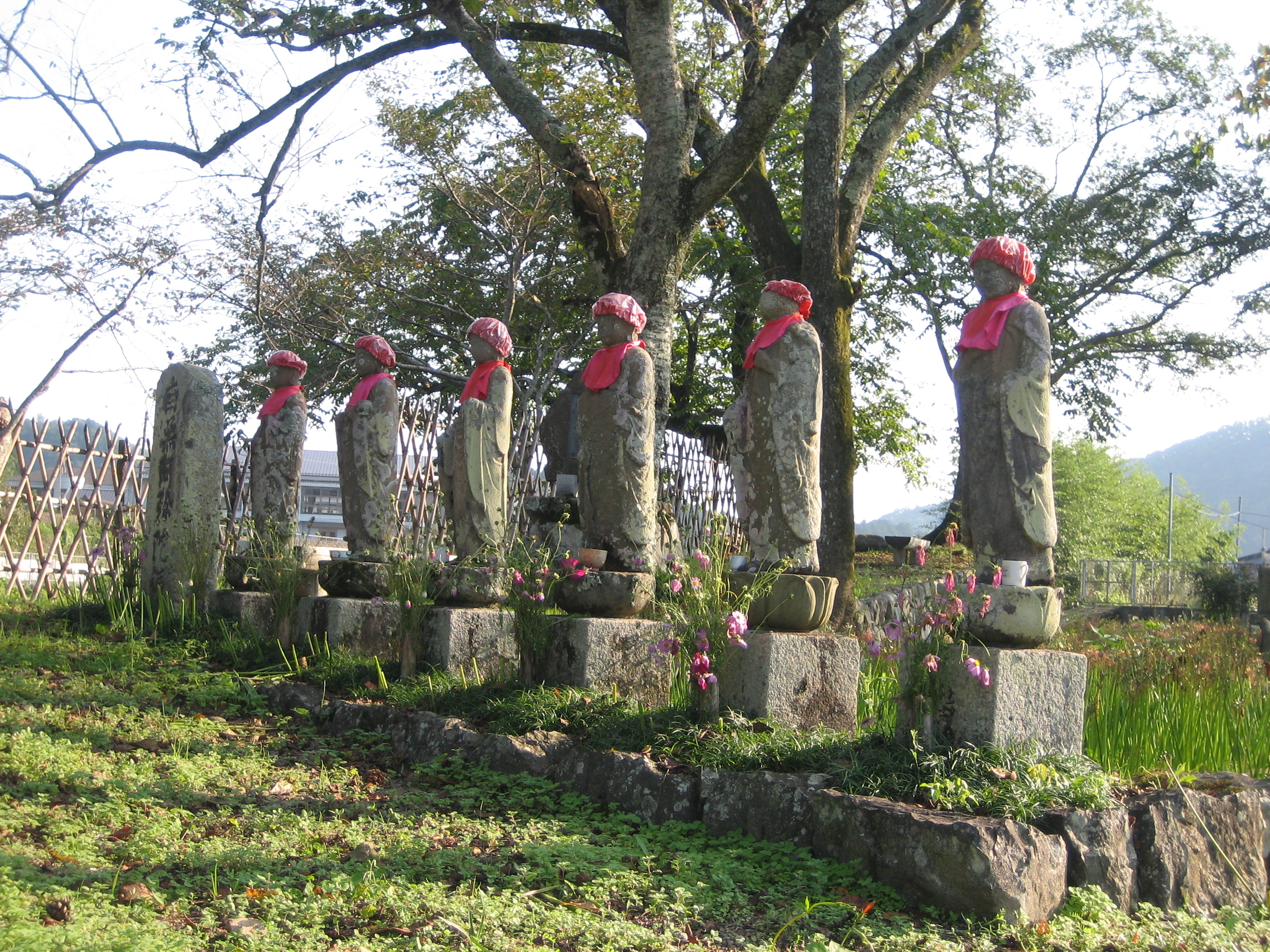
The rokujizō

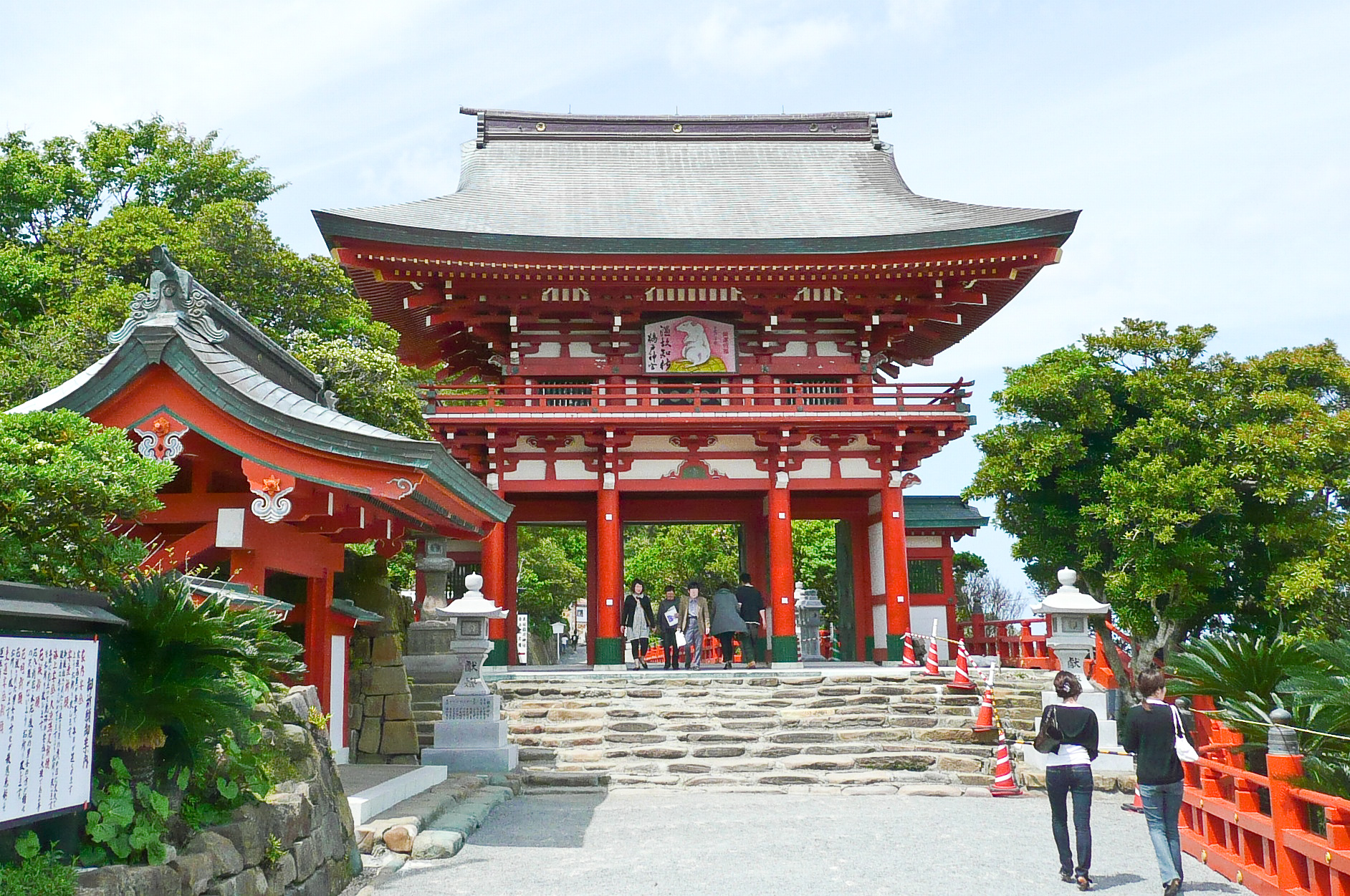
A rōmon

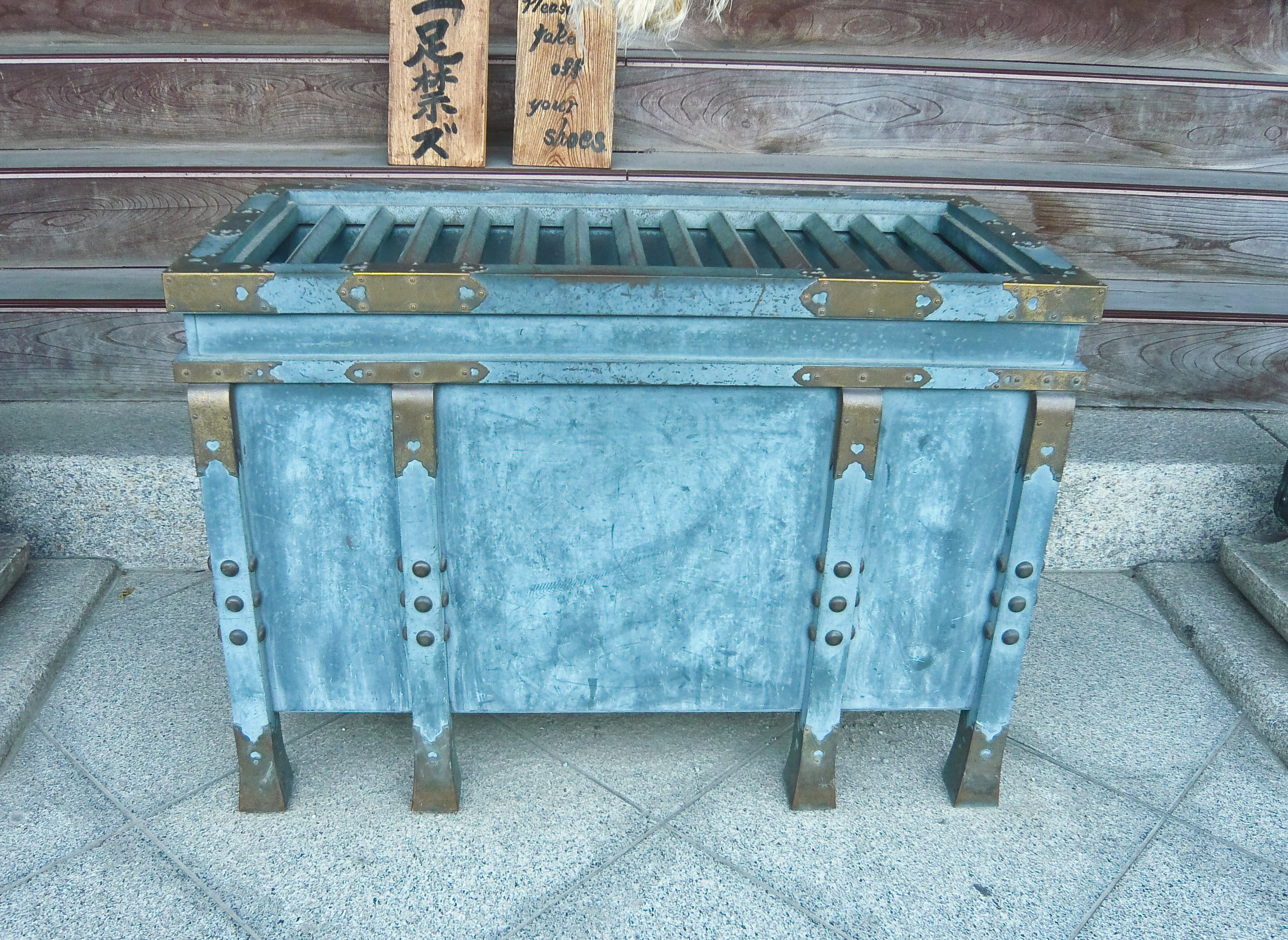
A saisen-bako, or offertory box

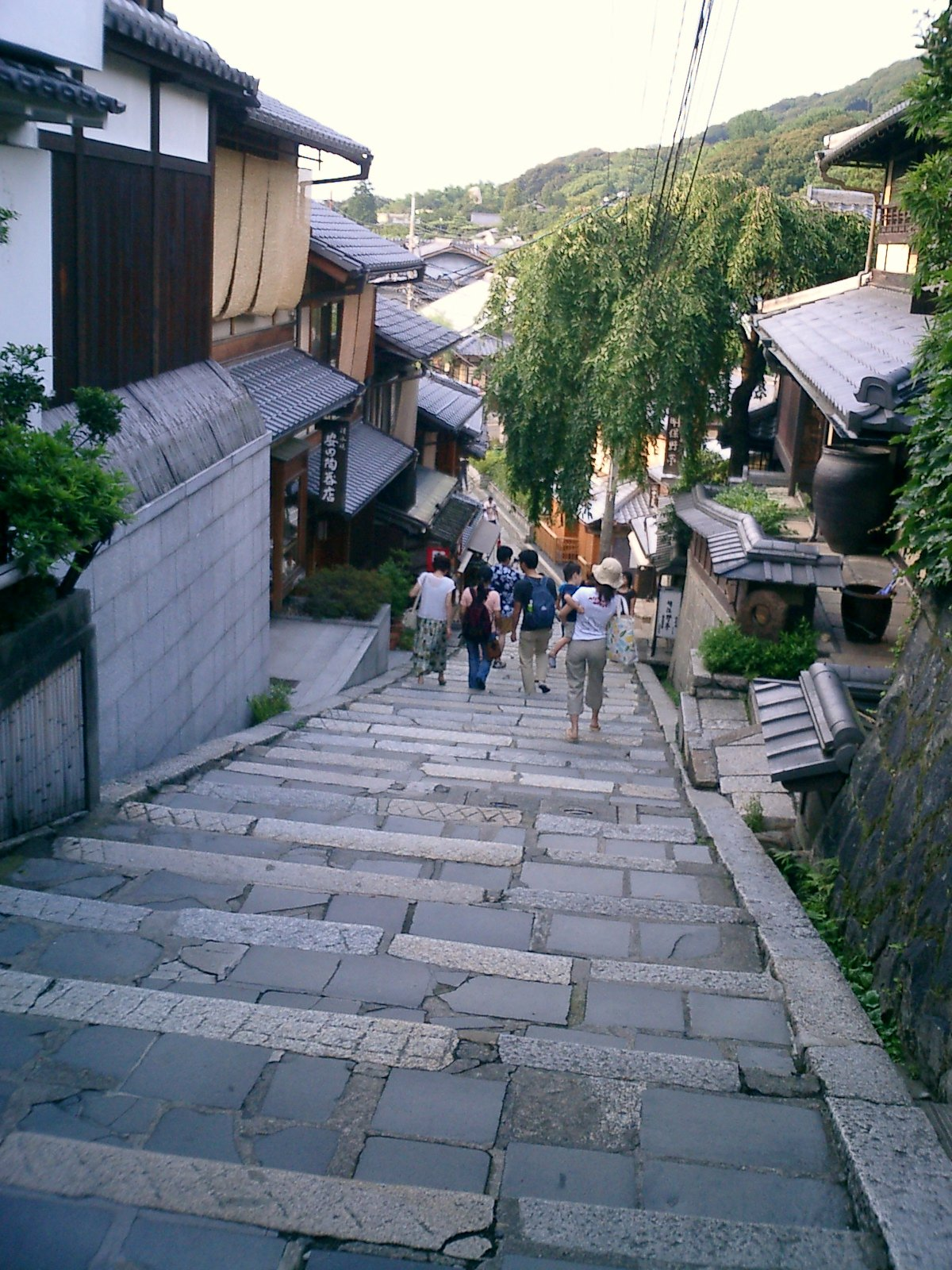
Kiyomizu-dera's sandō

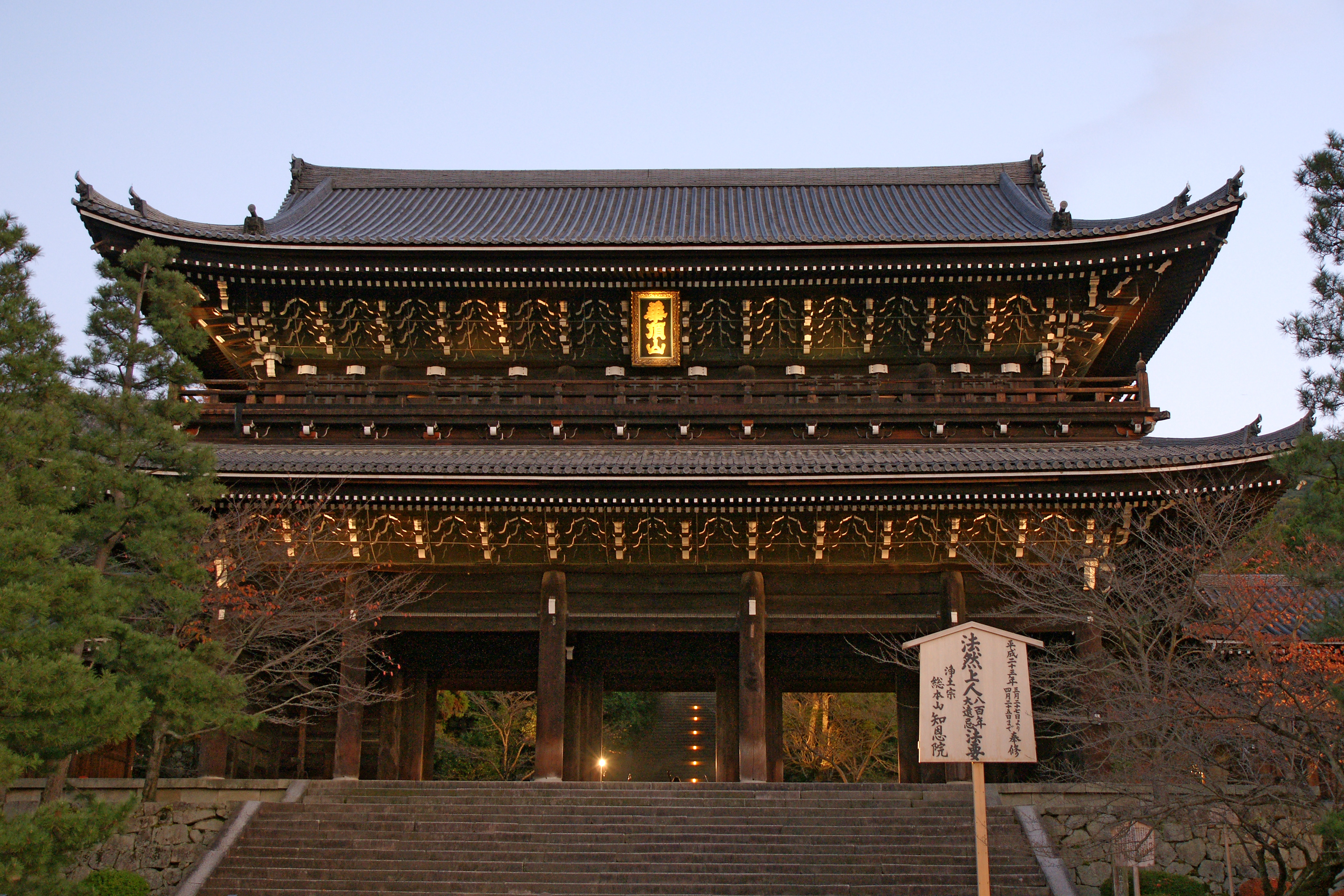
A high rank, five-bay sanmon at Chion-in. Note the sanrō.

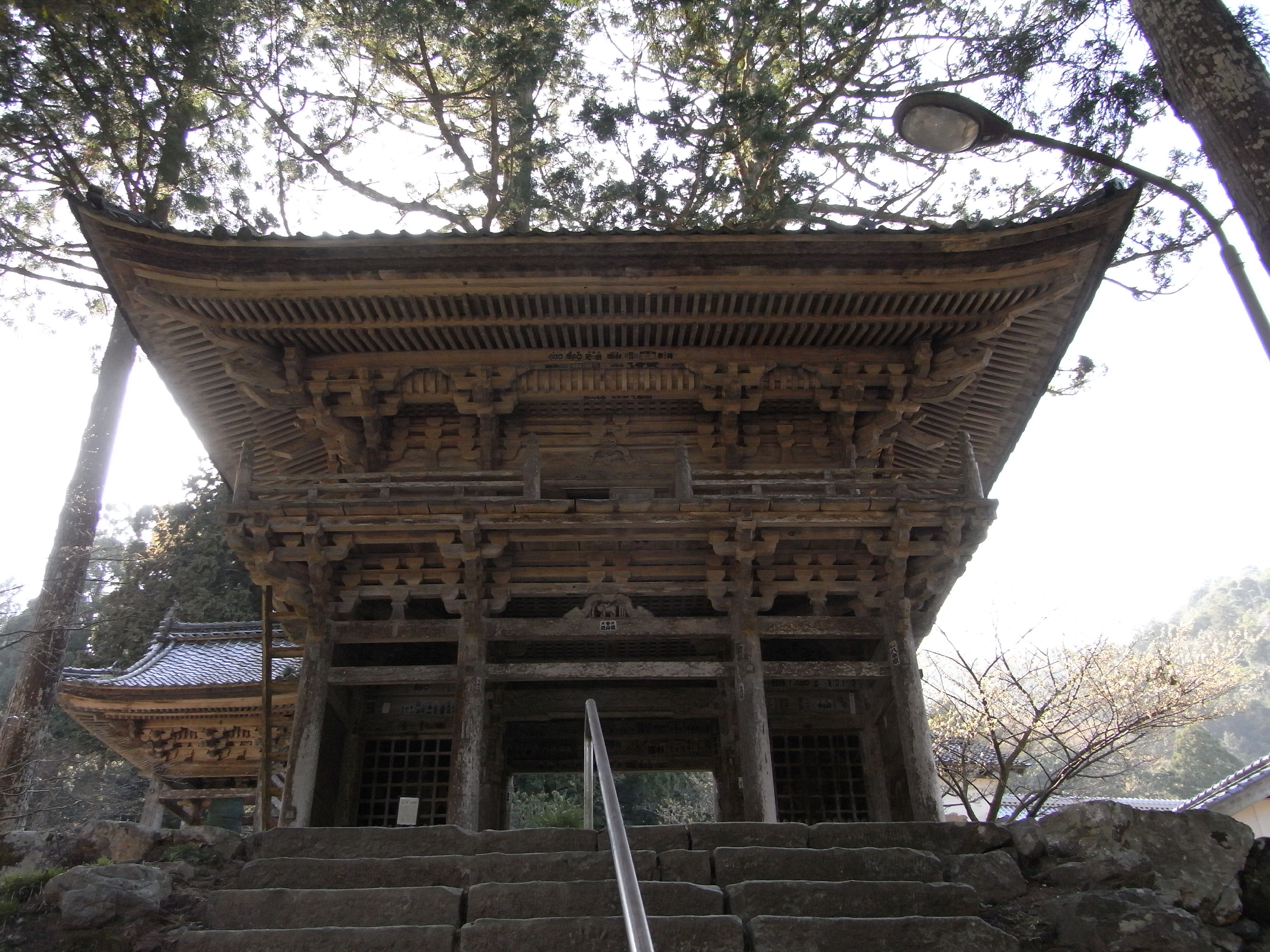
A middle rank, three-bay sanmon at Myōtsū-ji

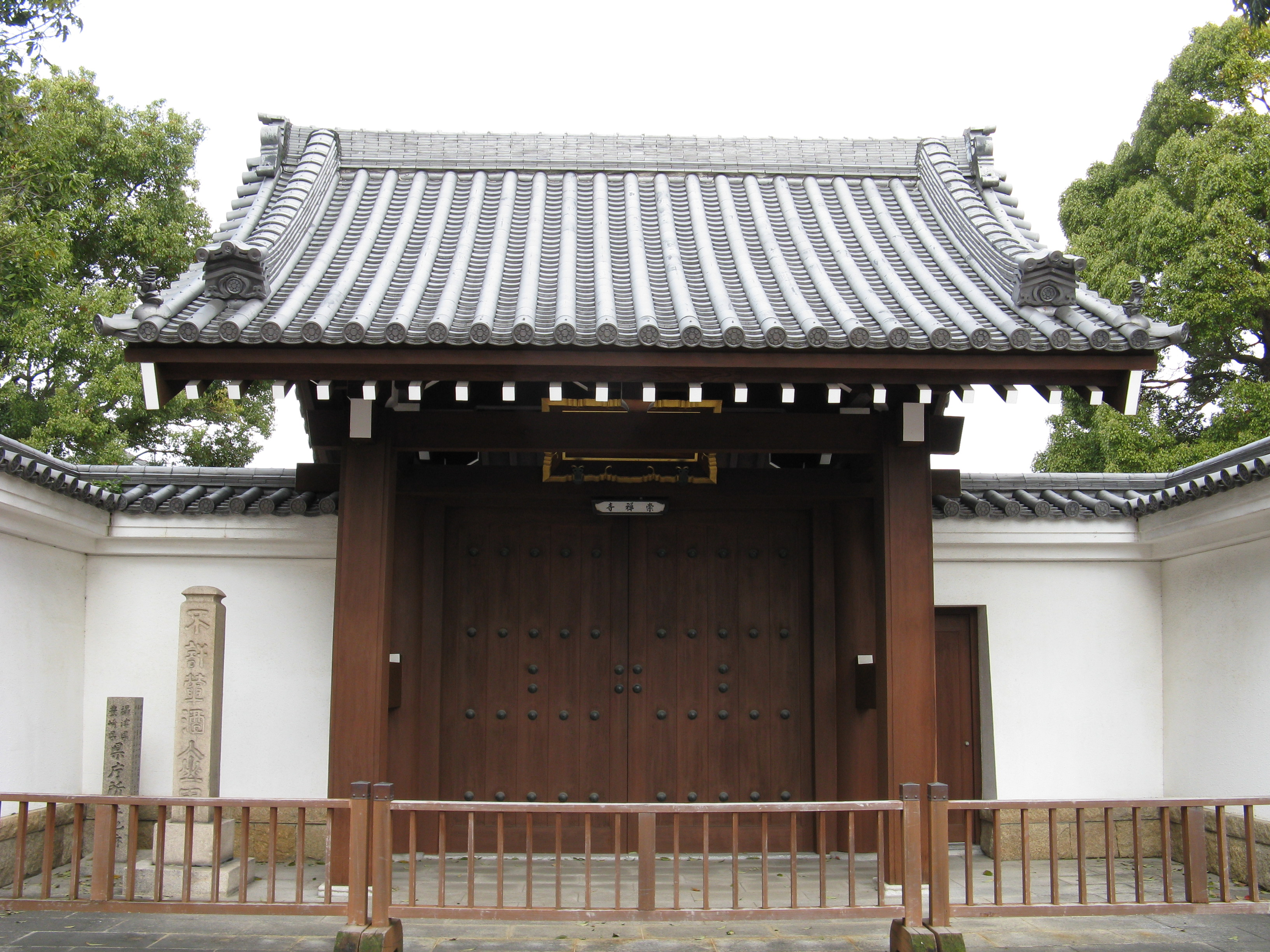
A low rank sanmon at Sozen-ji in Osaka

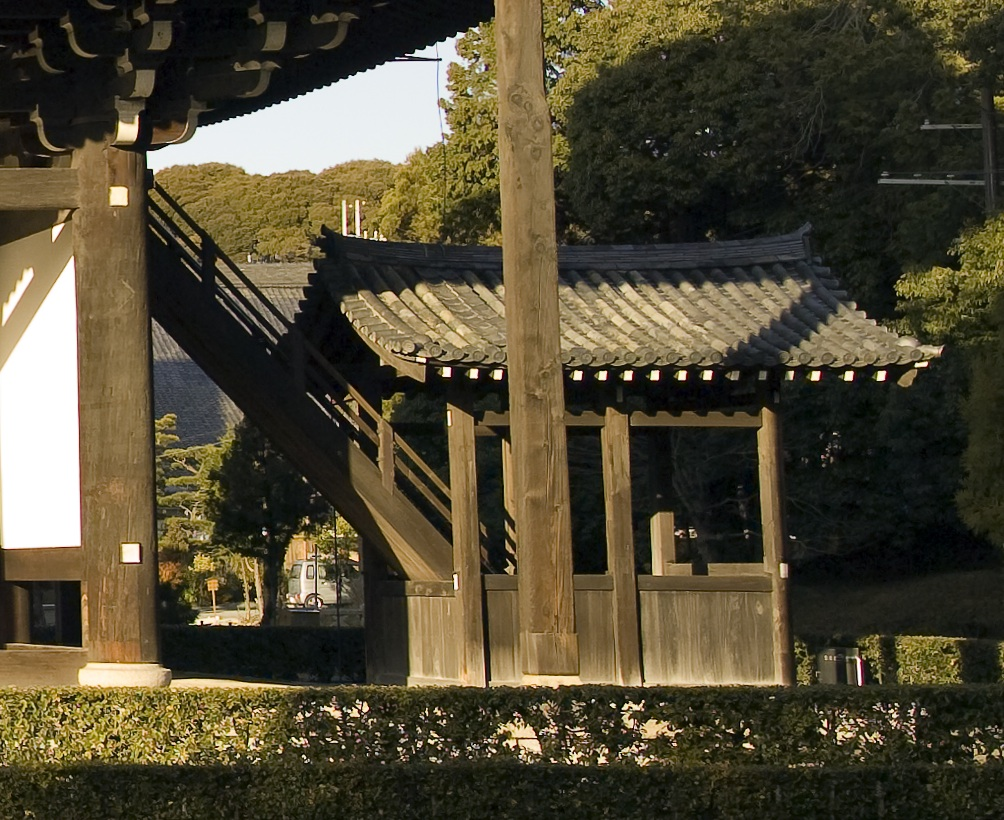
The sanrō of Tōfuku-ji's sanmon. (See also the sanmon's photo above.)

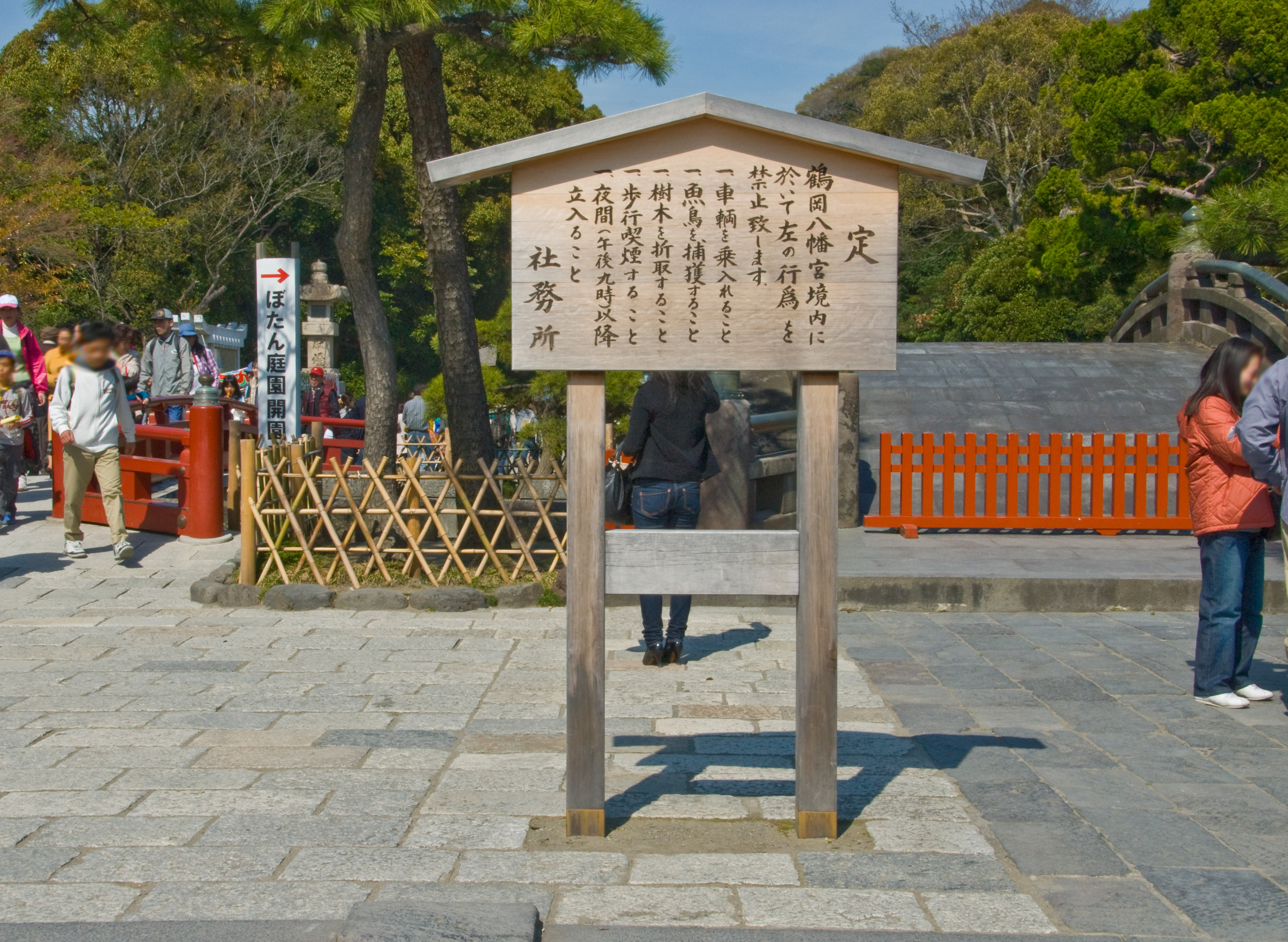
A seisatsu

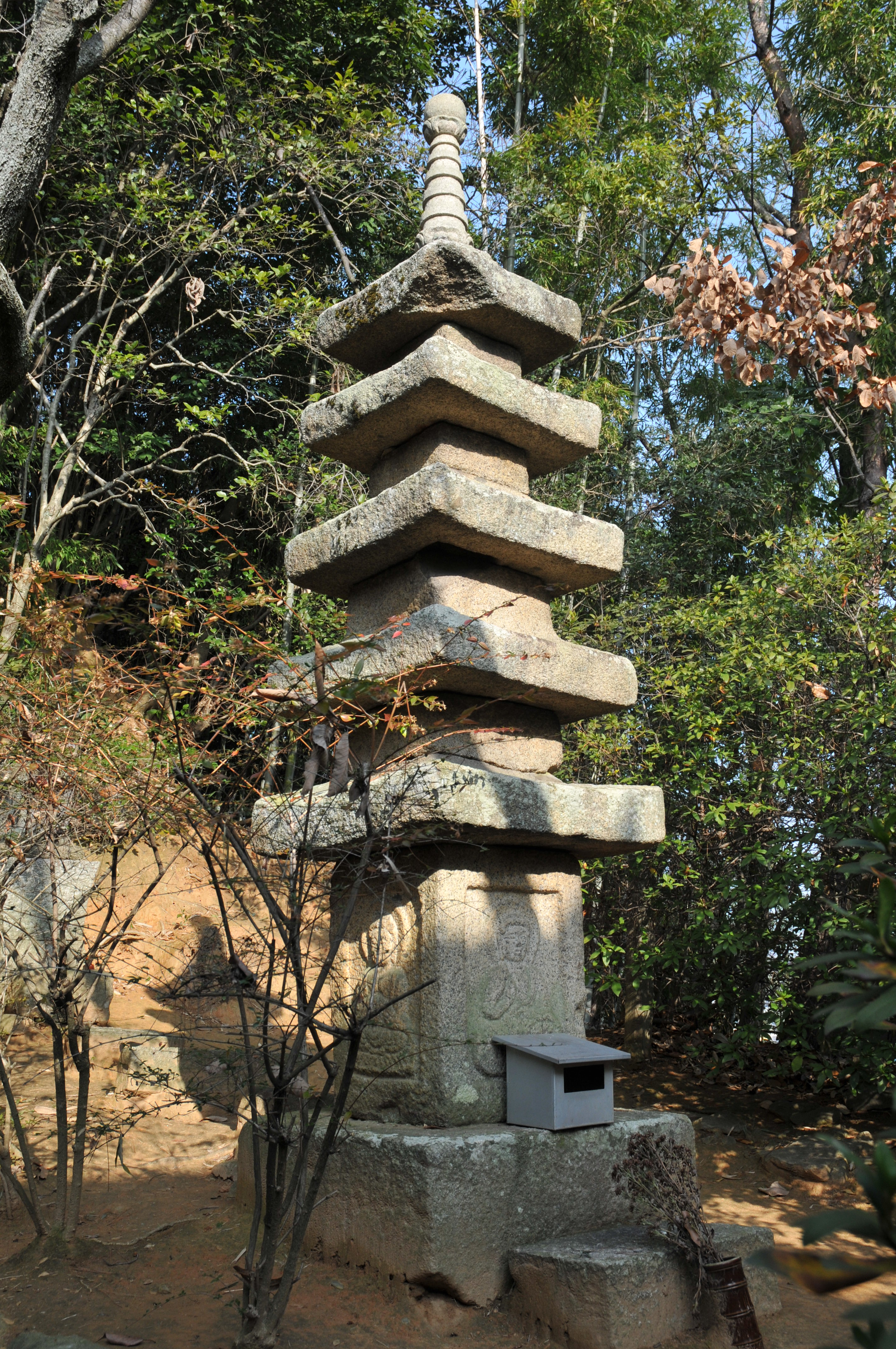
A sekitō, or stone pagoda

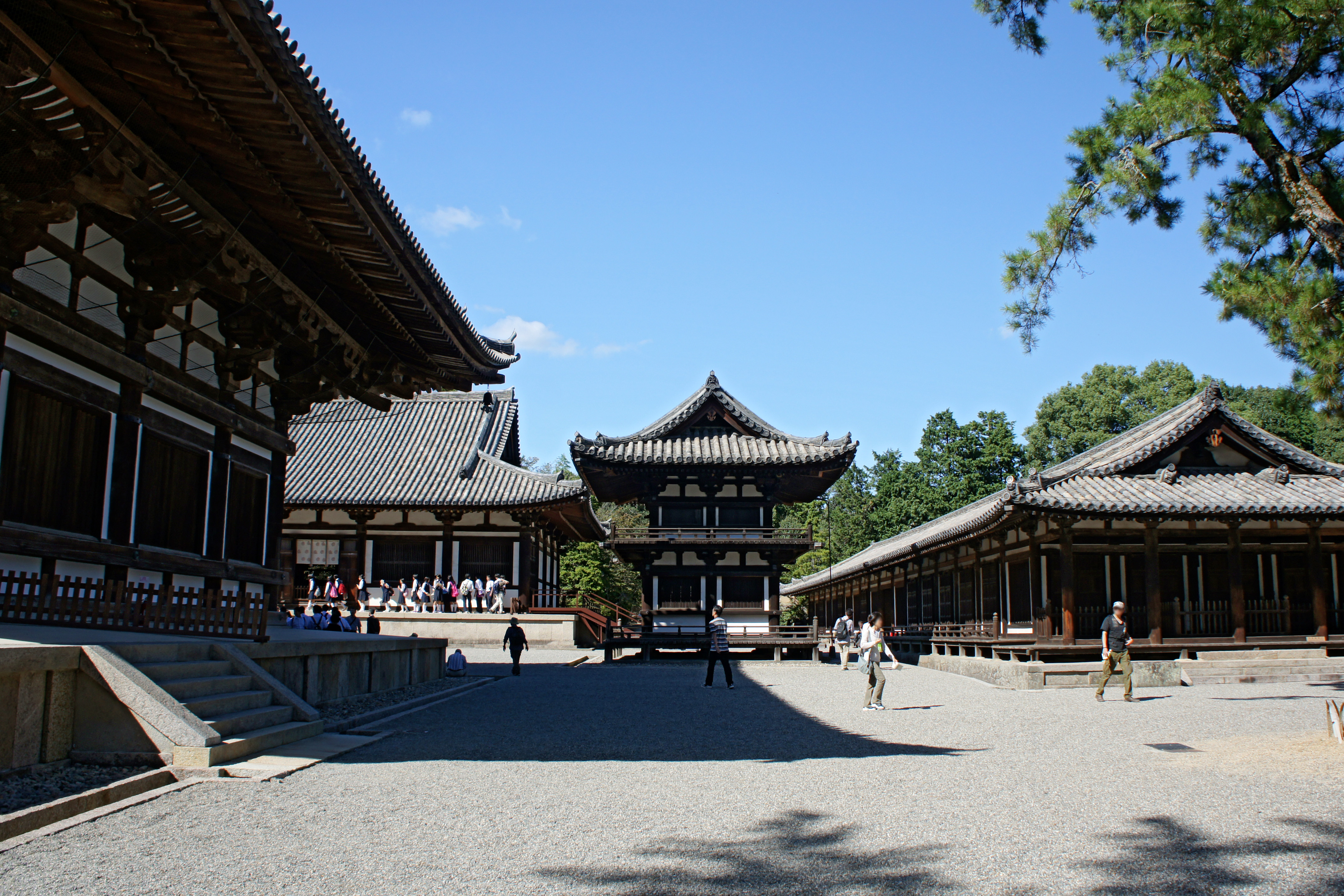
Tōshōdai-ji's shichidō garan (left to right, the kondō, the kōdō, and the korō)

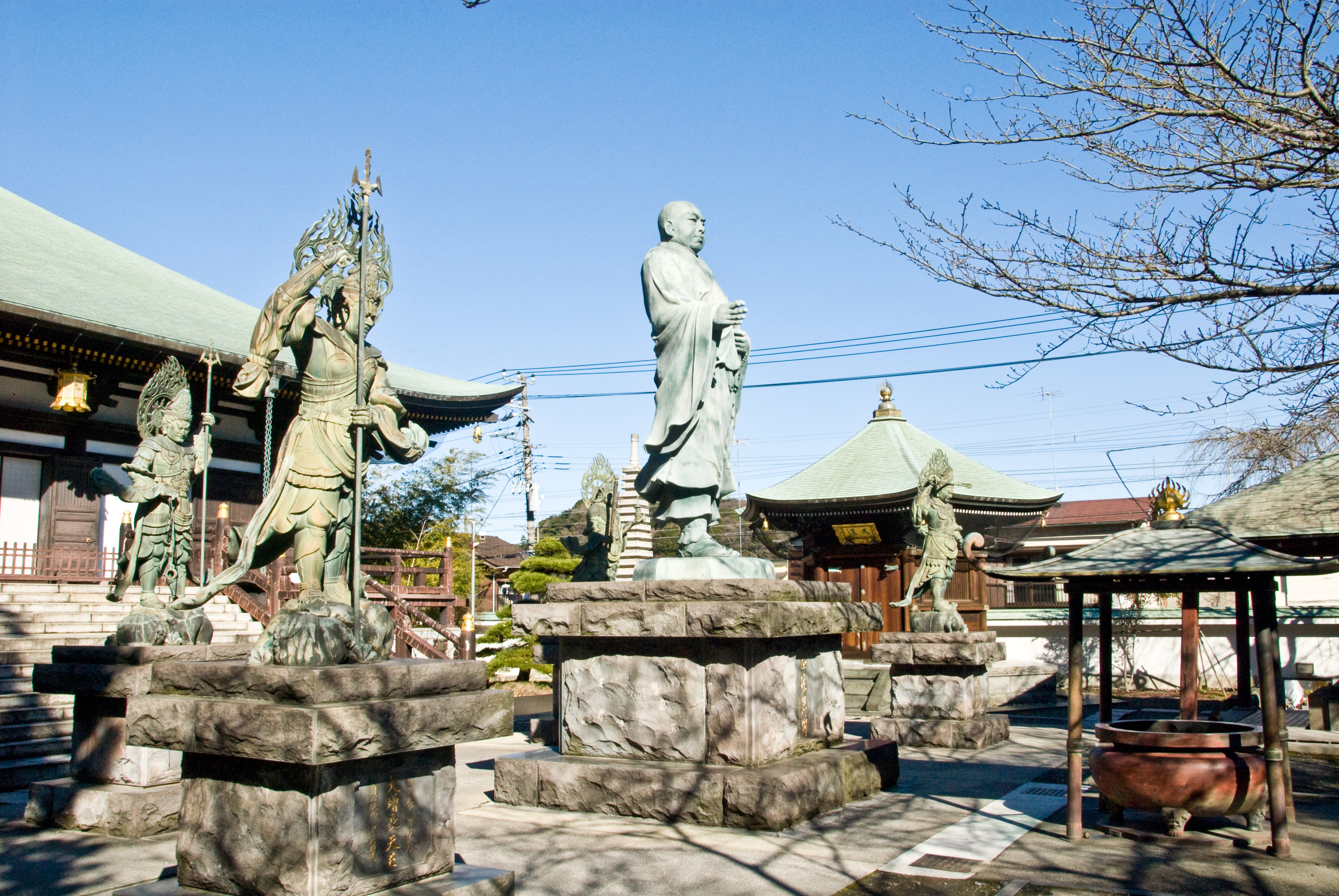
Statue of Nichiren guarded by the Shi Tennō

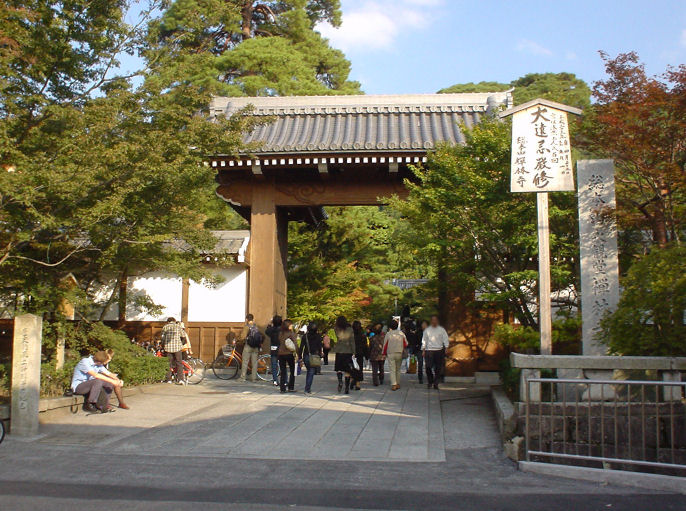
Zenrin-ji's sōmon

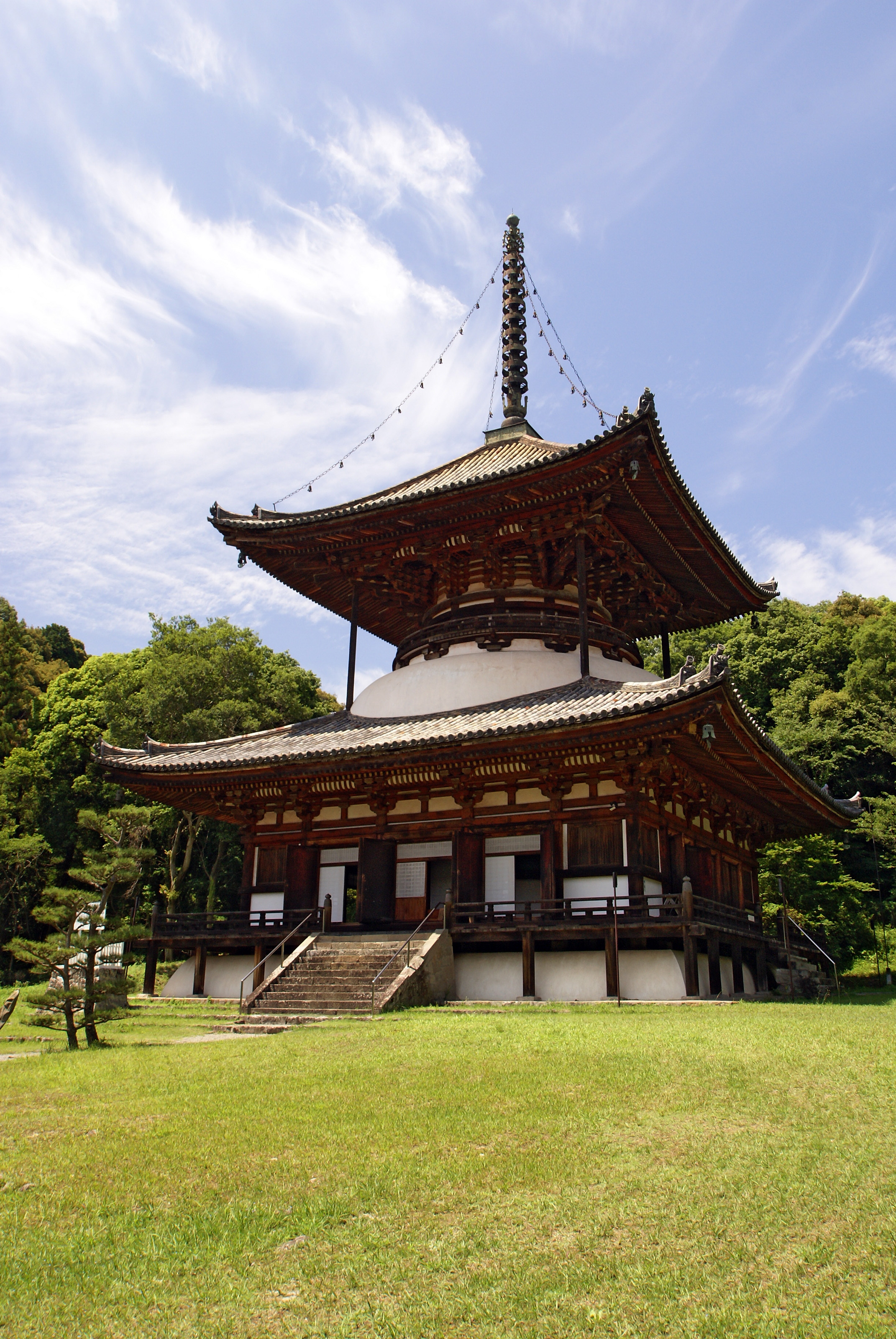
A large sōrin (metal spire) on top of Negoro-ji's tahōto

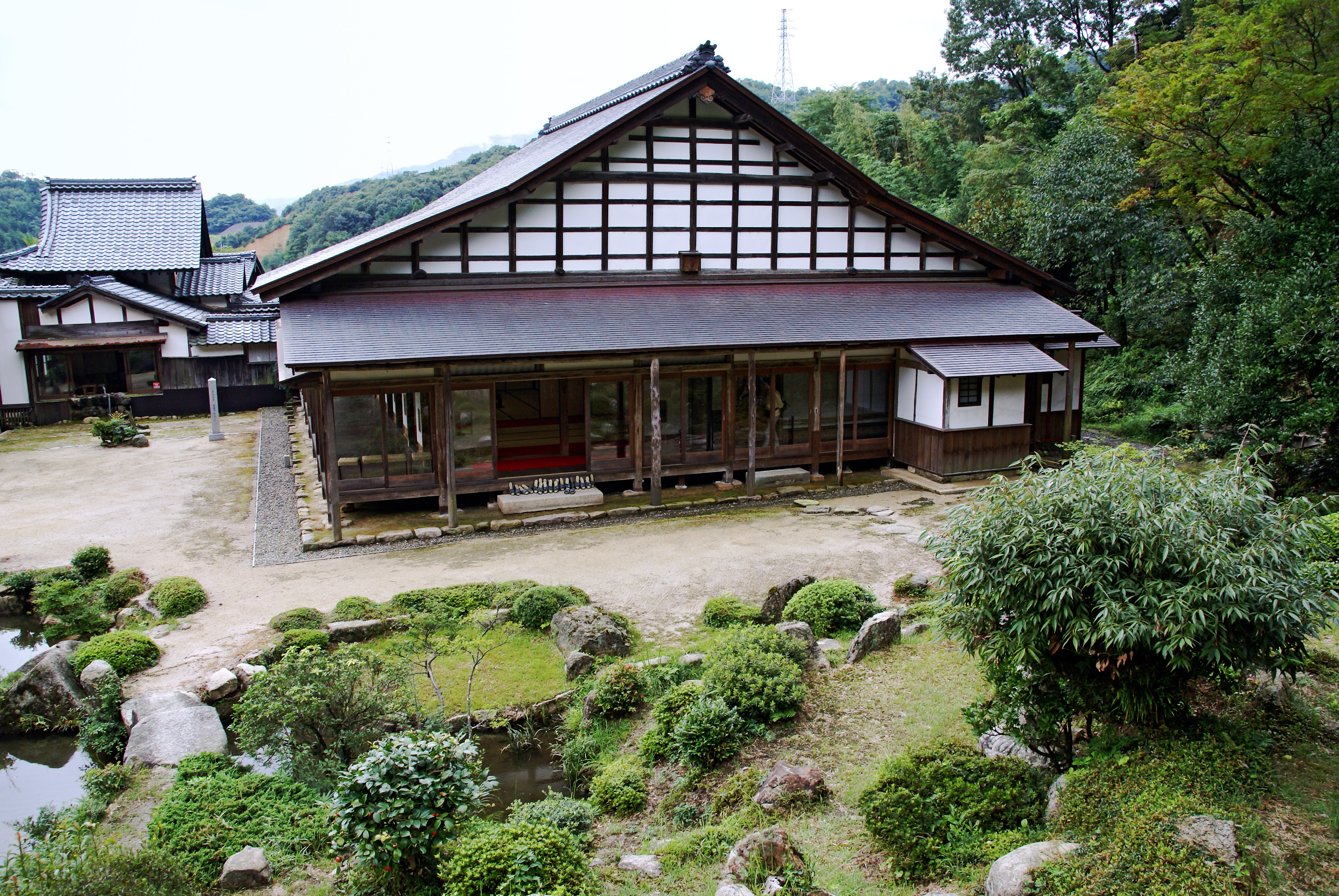
Saifuku-ji's shoin

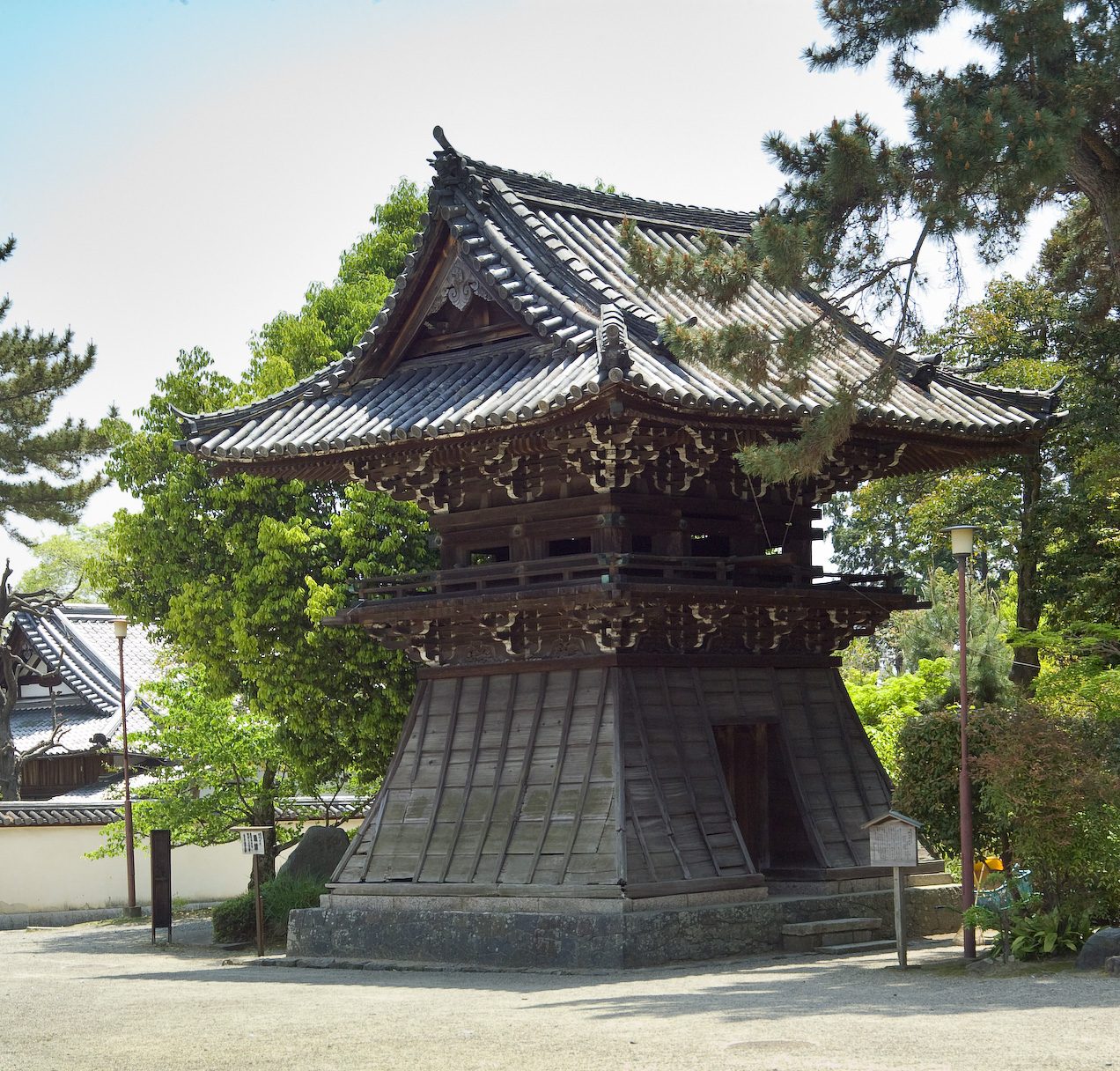
Saidai-ji's shōrō (early type)

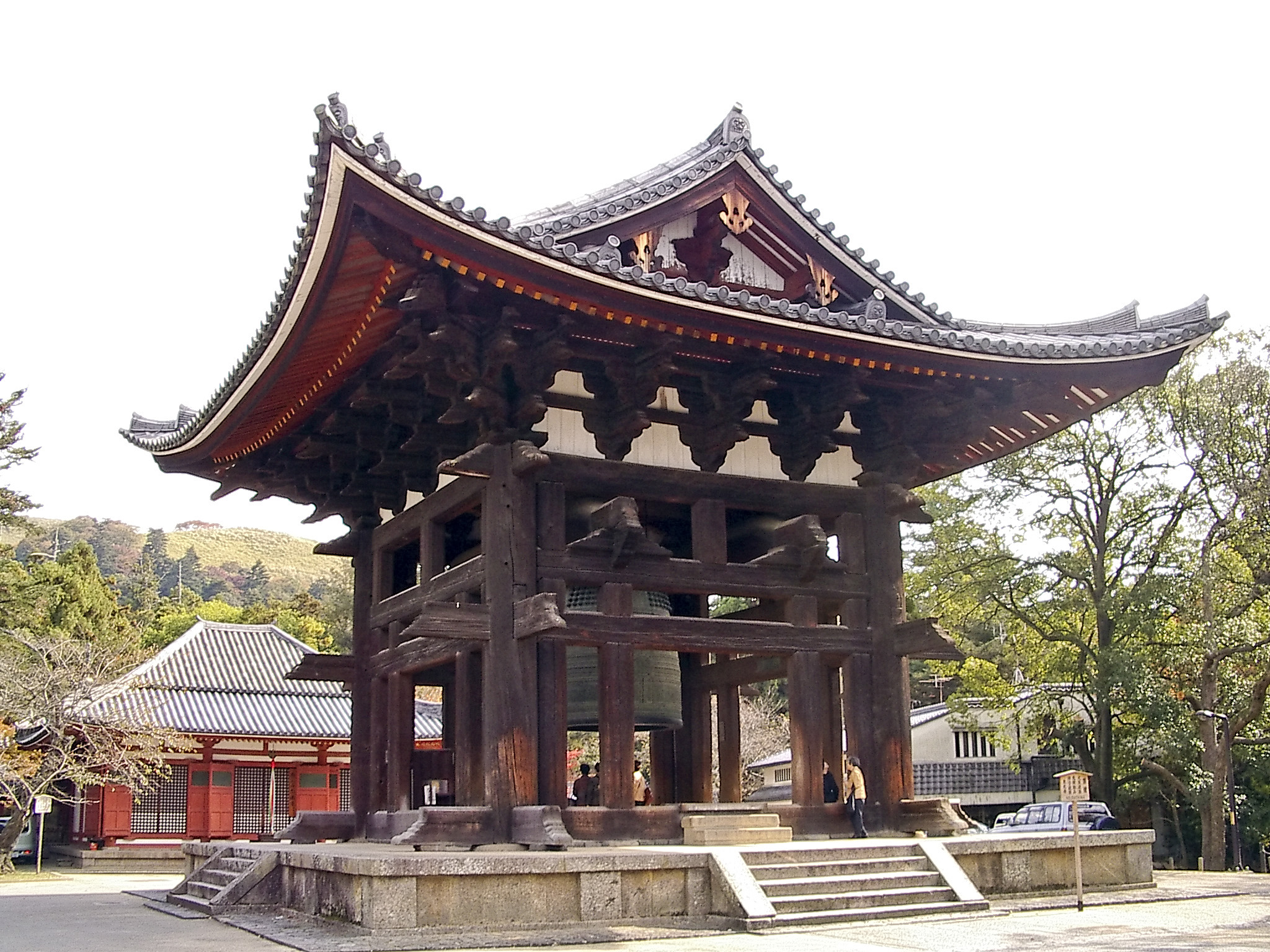
Tōdai-ji's shōrō (later type)

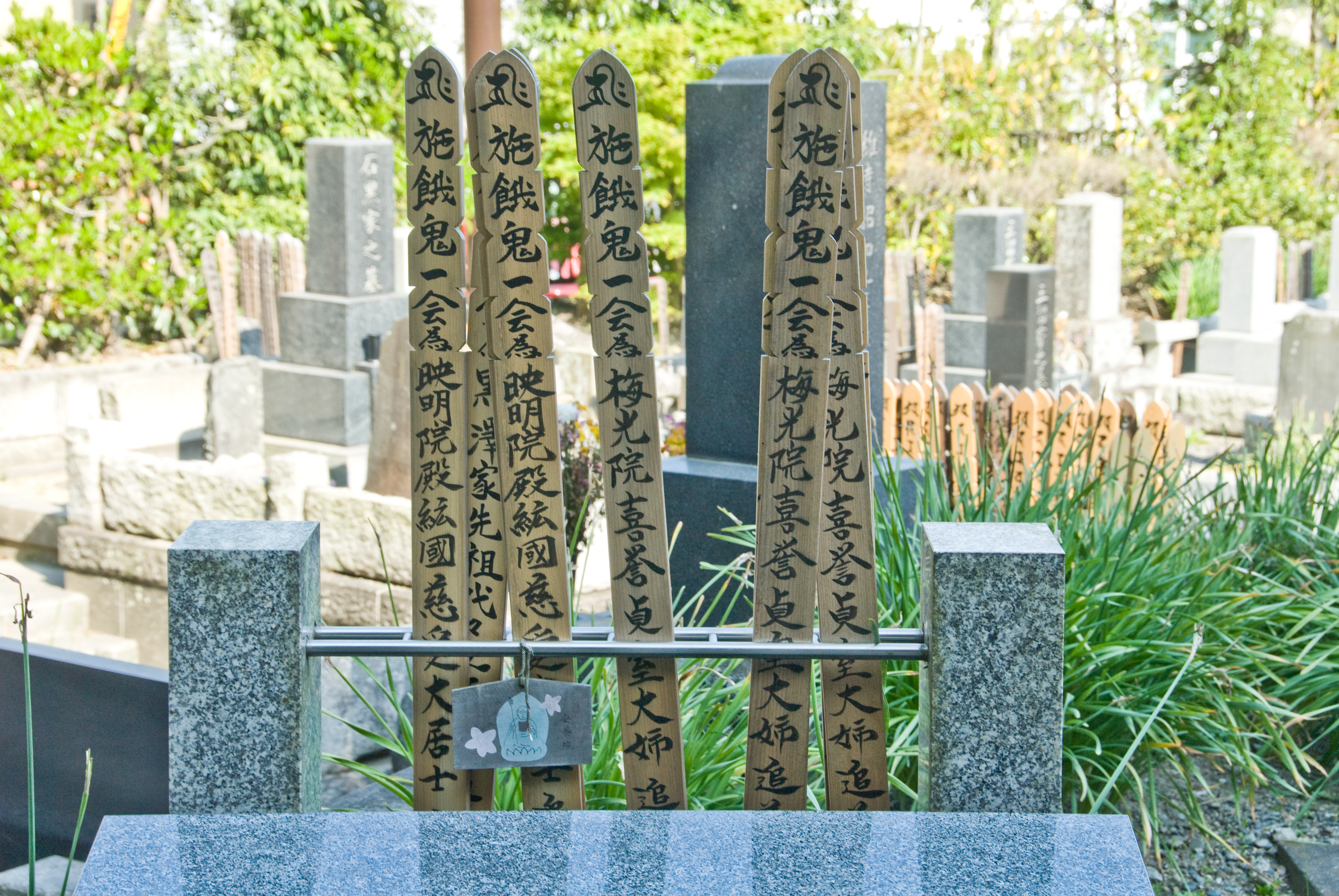
Some sotoba

== T ==
- tatchū (塔頭 or 塔中)
  - In Zen temples, a building containing a pagoda enshrining the ashes of an important priest stands.
  - Later, it became a subsidiary temple or a minor temple depending from a larger one.
  - Finally, it became also subsidiary temple being the family temple (**bodaiji**) of an important family.
- tahōtō* (多宝塔) – a two-storied **pagoda** with a ground floor having a dome-shaped ceiling and a square pent roof, a round second floor and square roofs.
- tariki (他力) - "other power", "outside help"
- temizuya* (手水舎) – a fountain near the entrance of a **shrine** and a temple where worshipers can cleanse their hands and mouths before worship.
- temple – term used with shrine to mirror in English the distinction between the Japanese words **tera** and jinja. The three most common temple name endings are:
  - -ji (寺) – most common suffix in temple names meaning simply "temple", as for example in Nanzen-ji.
  - -in (院) – less common and normally used for minor temples or subtemples, as for example Meigetsu-in.
  - – dera (寺) – alternate reading of -ji, and identical in meaning. Used occasionally, for example in Kiyomizudera
- Ten (天) - an Indian god of non Buddhist origin, for example Benzaiten, Bonten, Taishakuten, and Kankiten.
- tera (寺) – see temple.
- terauke – document granted by temples to their **danka** during the Edo period to certify they were not Christian.
- tesaki* (手先) – Term used to count the roof-supporting brackets (tokyō (斗きょう)) projecting from a temple's wall, usually composed of two steps (futatesaki (二手先）)) or three (mitesaki 三津手先).
- tokyō (斗きょう) – see tesaki.
- torii* (鳥居)- the iconic Shinto gate at the entrance of a sacred area, usually, but not always, a 'shrine. Shrines of various size can be found next to, or inside temples.
- tōrō* (灯籠) – a lantern at a **shrine** or Buddhist temple. Some of its forms are influenced by the **gorintō**.
- tō (塔)
  - Generic word for tower, and for pagoda (an evolution of the **stupa**) in particular, and. After reaching China, the **stupa** evolved into a tower with an odd number of tiers (three, five, seven, nine, thirteen), excepted the **tahōtō**, which has two.
  - The word is used together as a suffix of a numeral indicating the number of a pagoda's tiers (three tiers= san-jū-no-tō, five tiers= go-jū-no-tō, seven tiers = nana-jū-no-tō, etc.).
- tōsu* or tōshi (東司) – a Zen monastery's toilet.
- tsuizen (追善) – Buddhist ceremony held on the anniversary of someone's death.
- Twelve Heavenly Generals – see Jūni Shinshō

== U ==
- Ungyō (吽形) – A statue (of a **Niō**, **komainu**, etc.) with its mouth closed to pronounce the sound "un", last letter of the Sanskrit alphabet and symbol of the end of all things. See also **Agyō**.

== V ==
- Vairocana – Vairocana is a **buddha** who is the embodiment of Dharmakaya, and who therefore can be seen as the universal aspect of the historical Gautama Buddha. Called **Dainichi Nyorai** in Japanese.

== Y ==
- Yakushi Nyorai (薬師如来) – Japanese name of Bhaisajyaguru, the Buddha of healing.
- Yakushi-dō* (薬師堂) – a building that enshrines a statue of Yakushi Nyorai.
- yodarekake (涎掛け) – votive bibs found on **Jizō** and statues of foxes, sacred to kami Inari.
- yokushitsu* (浴室) – a monastery's bathroom.
- yosemune-zukuri* (寄棟造) – A hipped roof where the front and back are trapezoidal and the sides triangular in shape. A classic example is Tōdai-ji's Daibutsuden.

== Z ==
- Zazen* (座禅) – transliteration of the Sanskrit **dhyāna**. The Zen performed sitting just down and meditating. Mainly an activity of Zen schools.
- Zen (禅) – Mahayana school of Buddhism that had great influence and power in Japan through the Five Mountain System (see **Gozan seido**). It is itself divided in three sub-schools, Sōtō (曹洞), Rinzai (臨済), and Ōbaku (黃檗).
- Zenchishiki (善知識, lit. "Good Friend(ship)") – The Japanese Shinto-Buddhist name for the Buddhist concept of Kalyāṇa-mittatā; similar to a Death doula.
- Zen-dō* (禅堂) – lit. "hall of Zen". The building where monks practice **zazen**, and one of the main structures of a Zen **garan**.
- Zokumyō (俗名) – the name a Buddhist priest had before taking his vows

== Gallery: T to Z ==
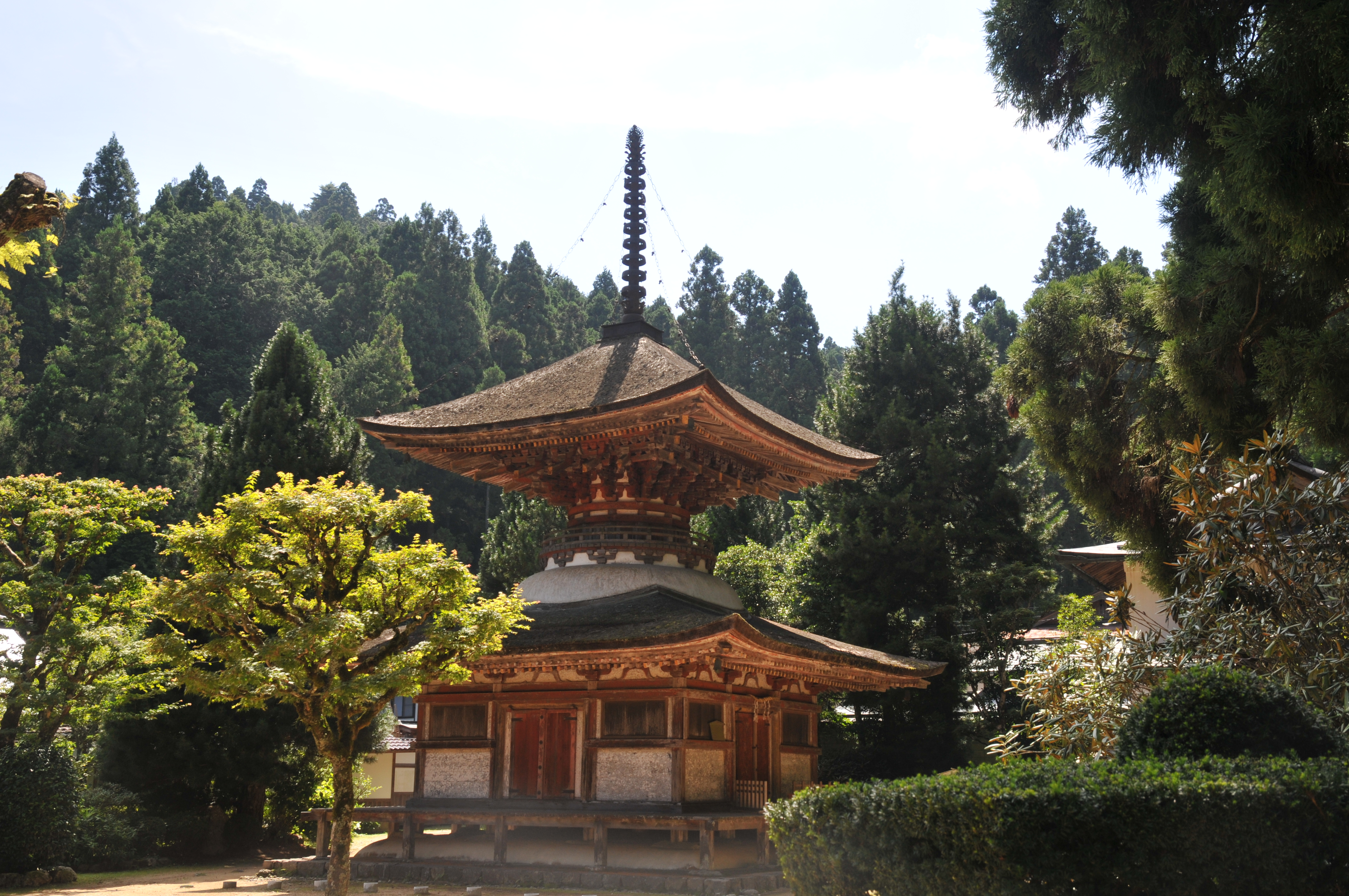
A tahōtō (nijū-no-tō)

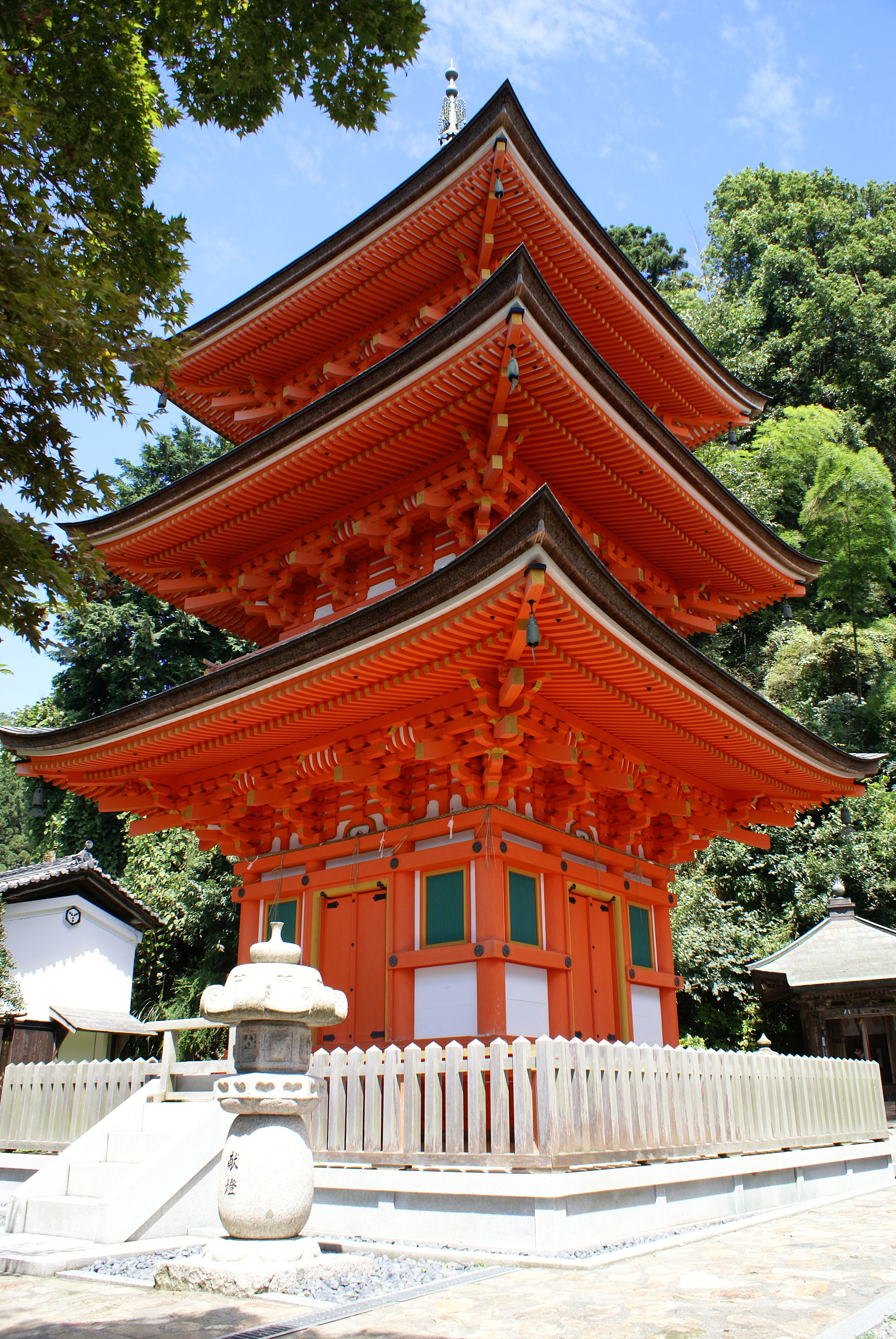
A three-tiered -to (sanjū-no-tō)

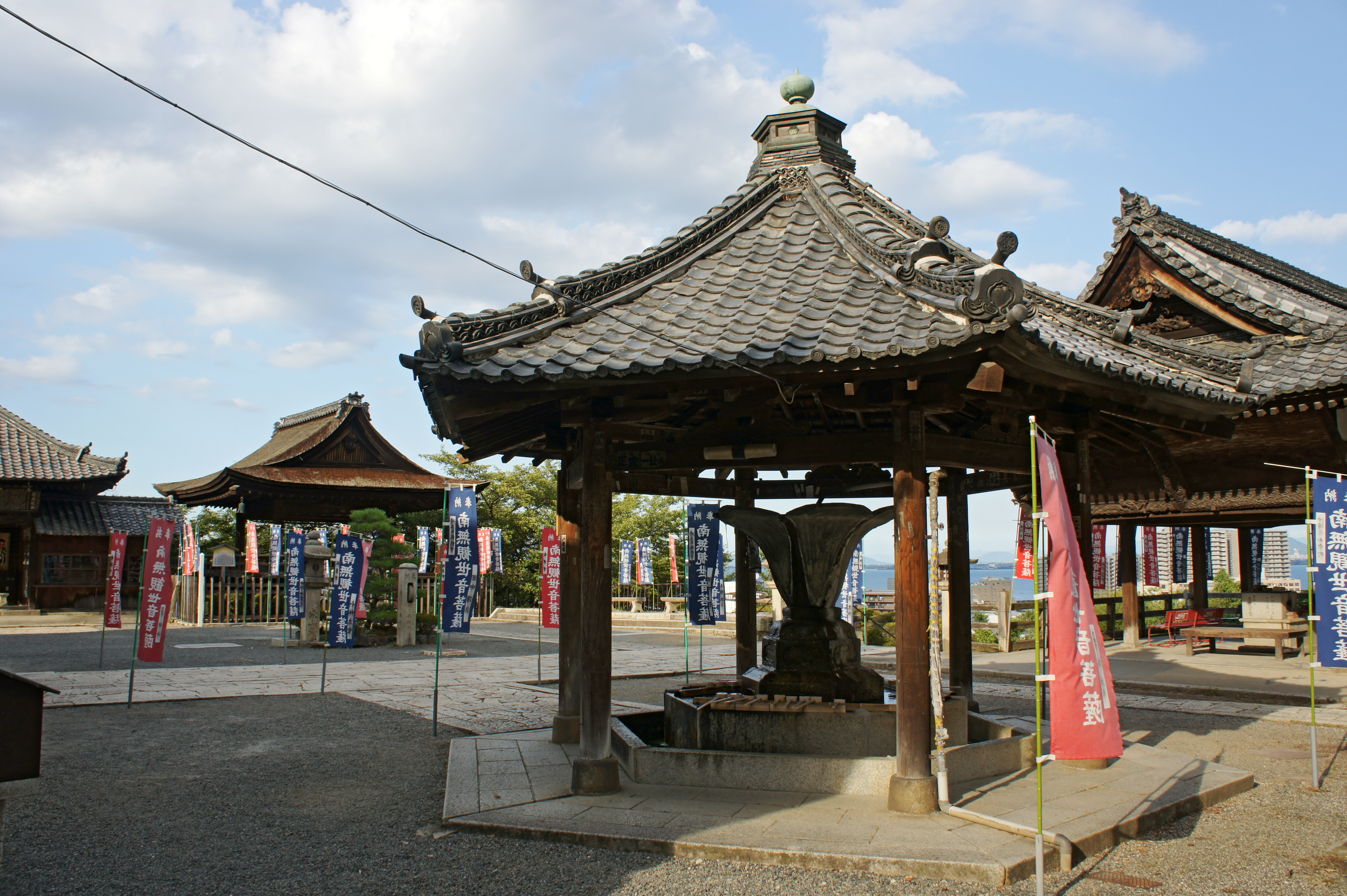
Mii-dera's temizuya

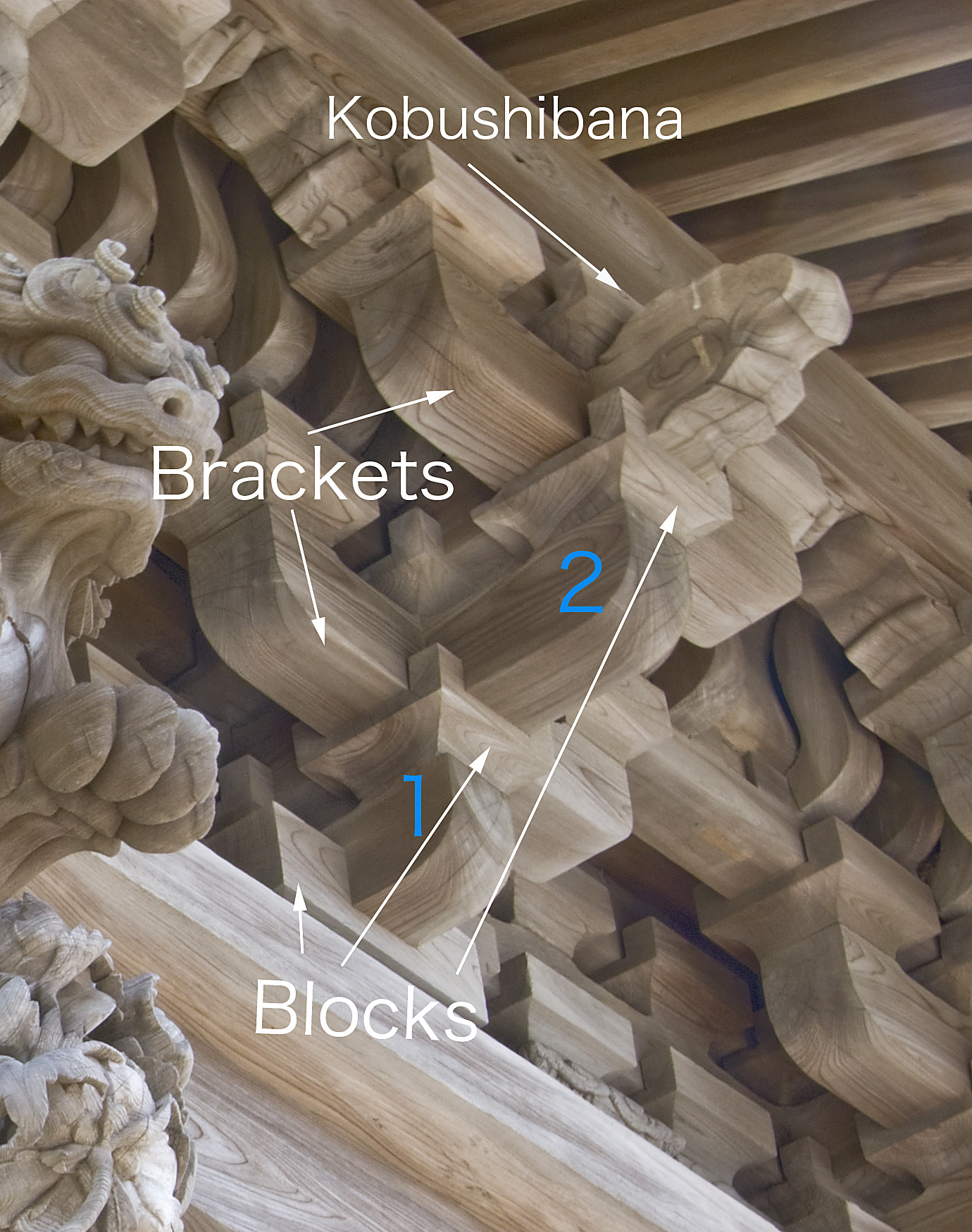
Two-tiered brackets (futatesaki tokyō). Enlarge to see numbers.

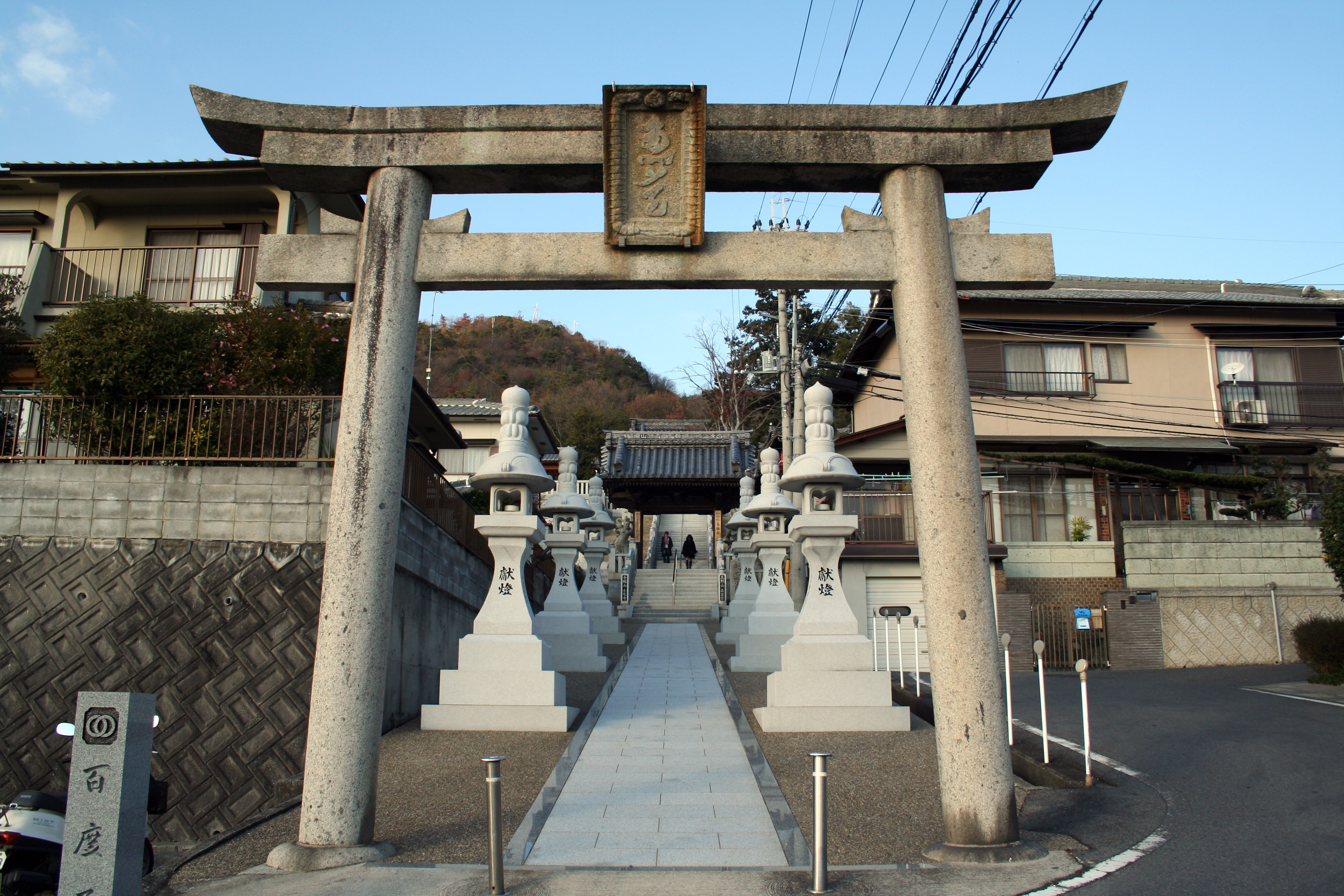
A torii on a temple's (Oyake-ji) sandō

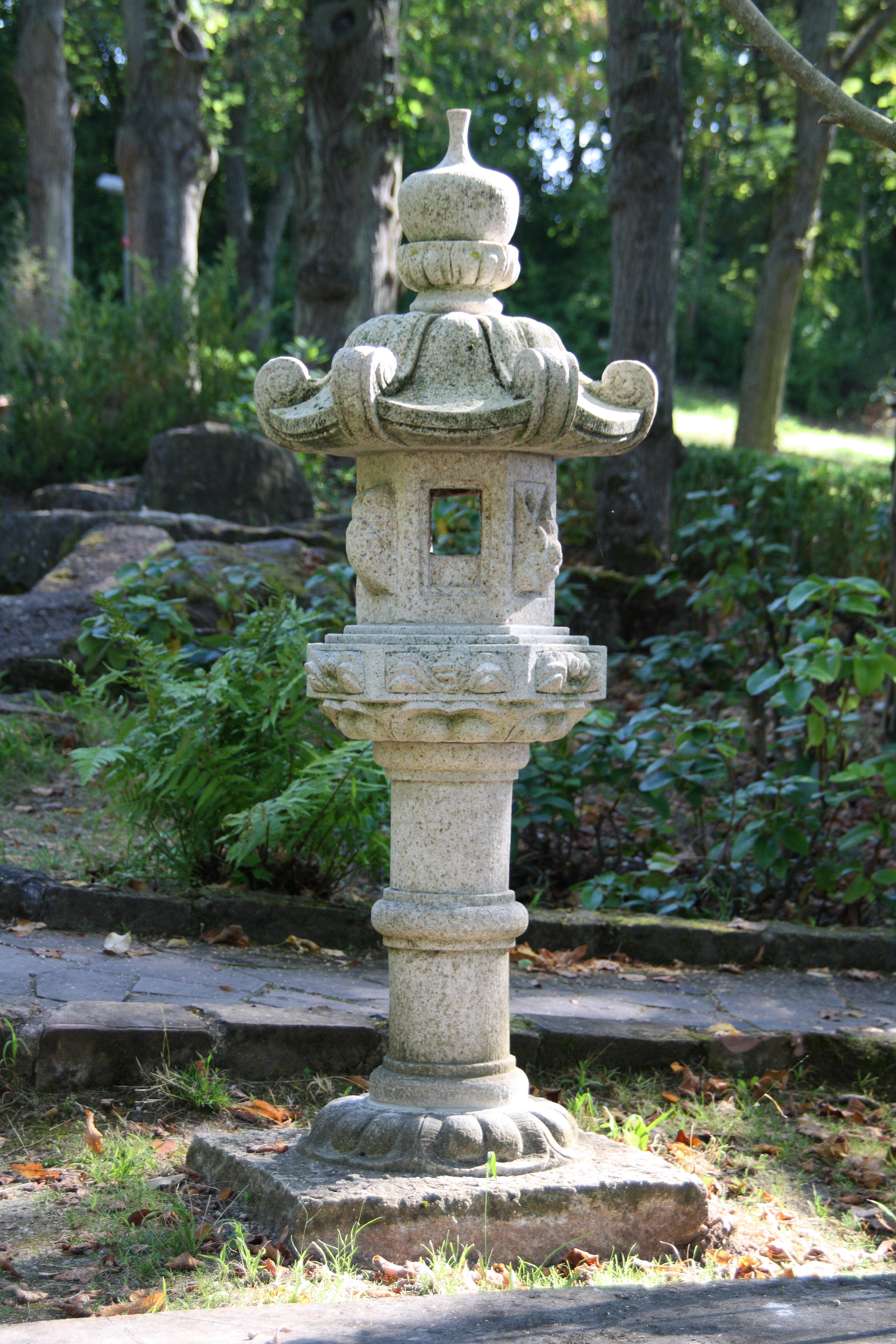
A tōrō

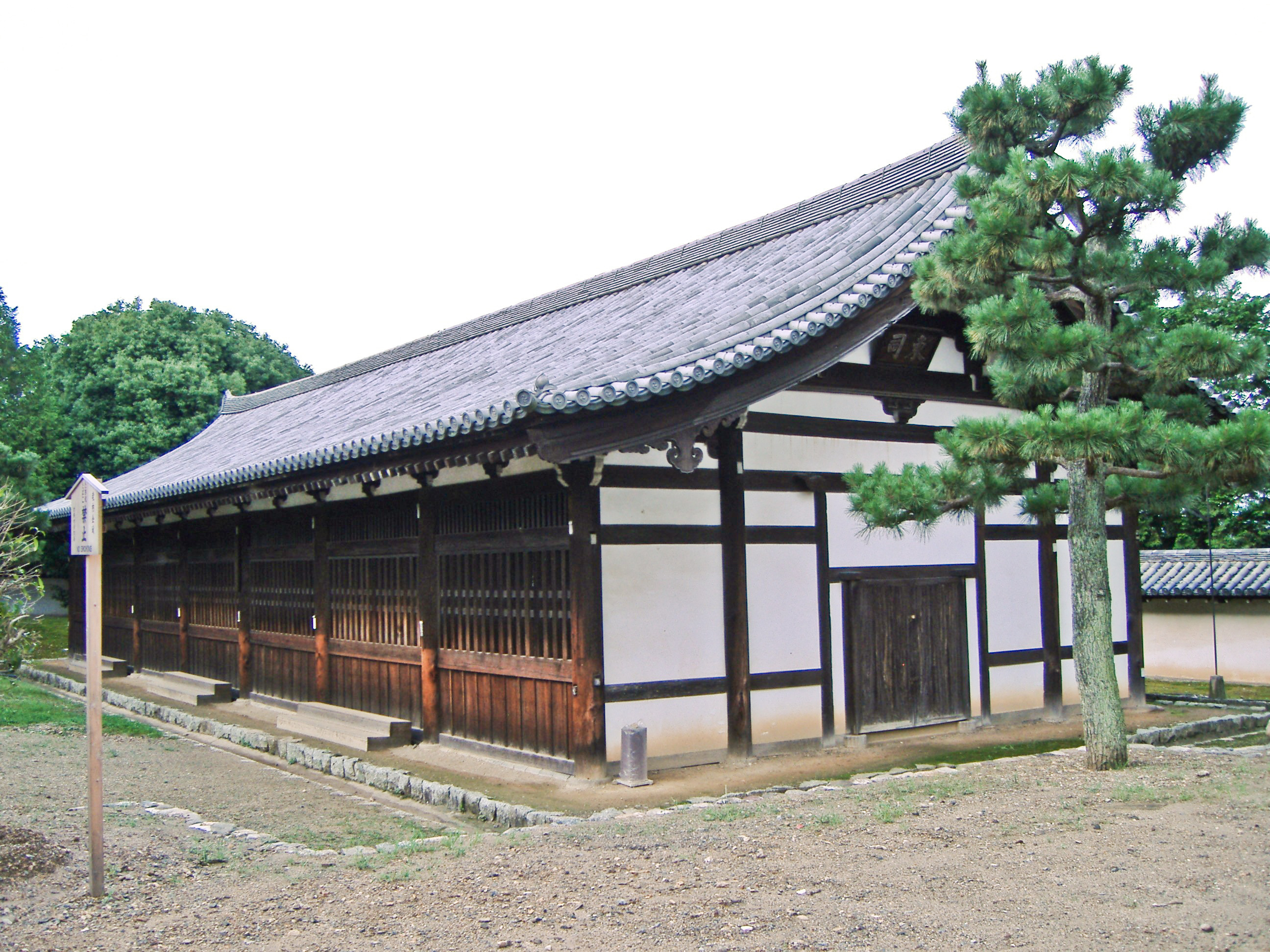
A tōsu

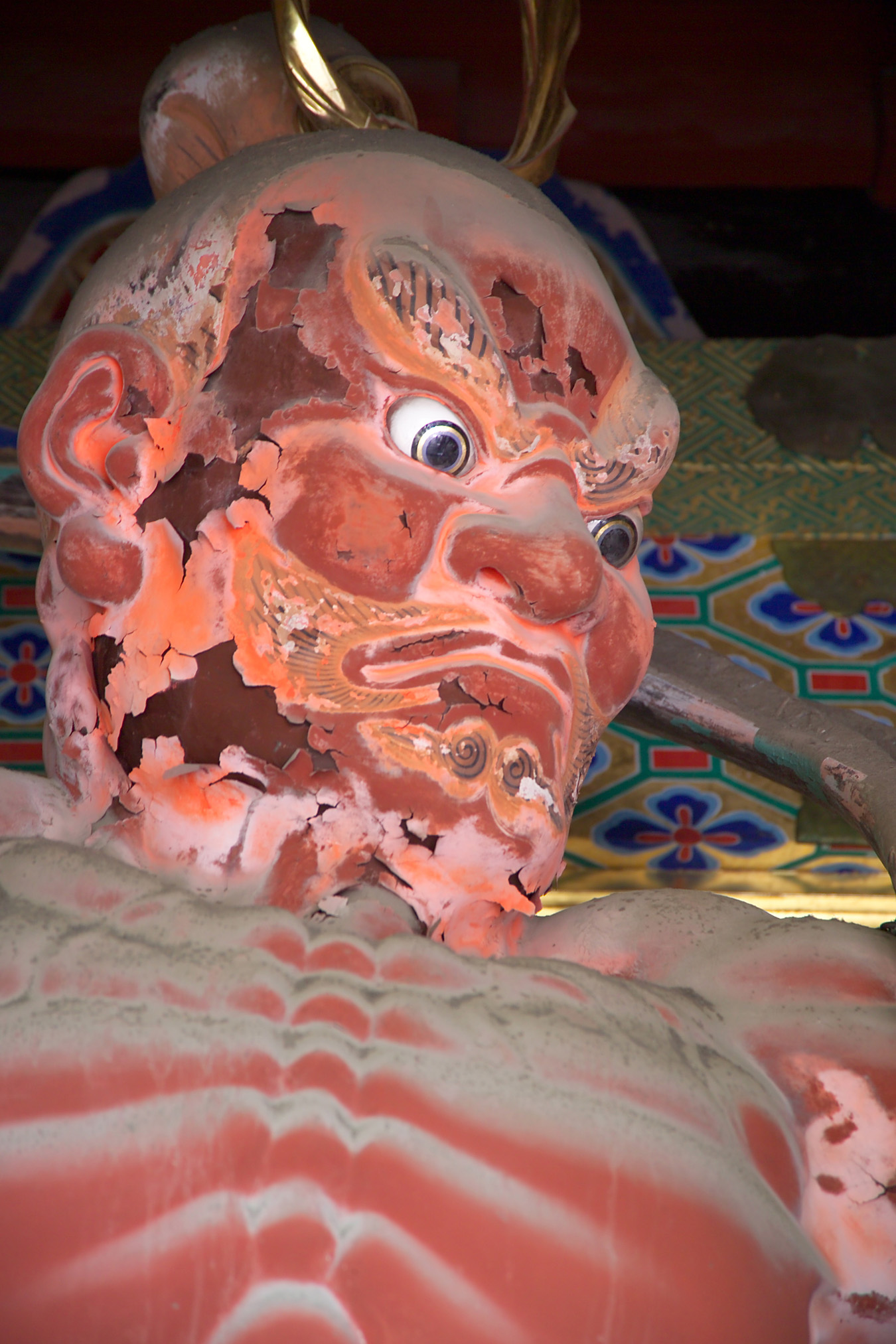
An example of ungyō (in this case, a **Niō**)

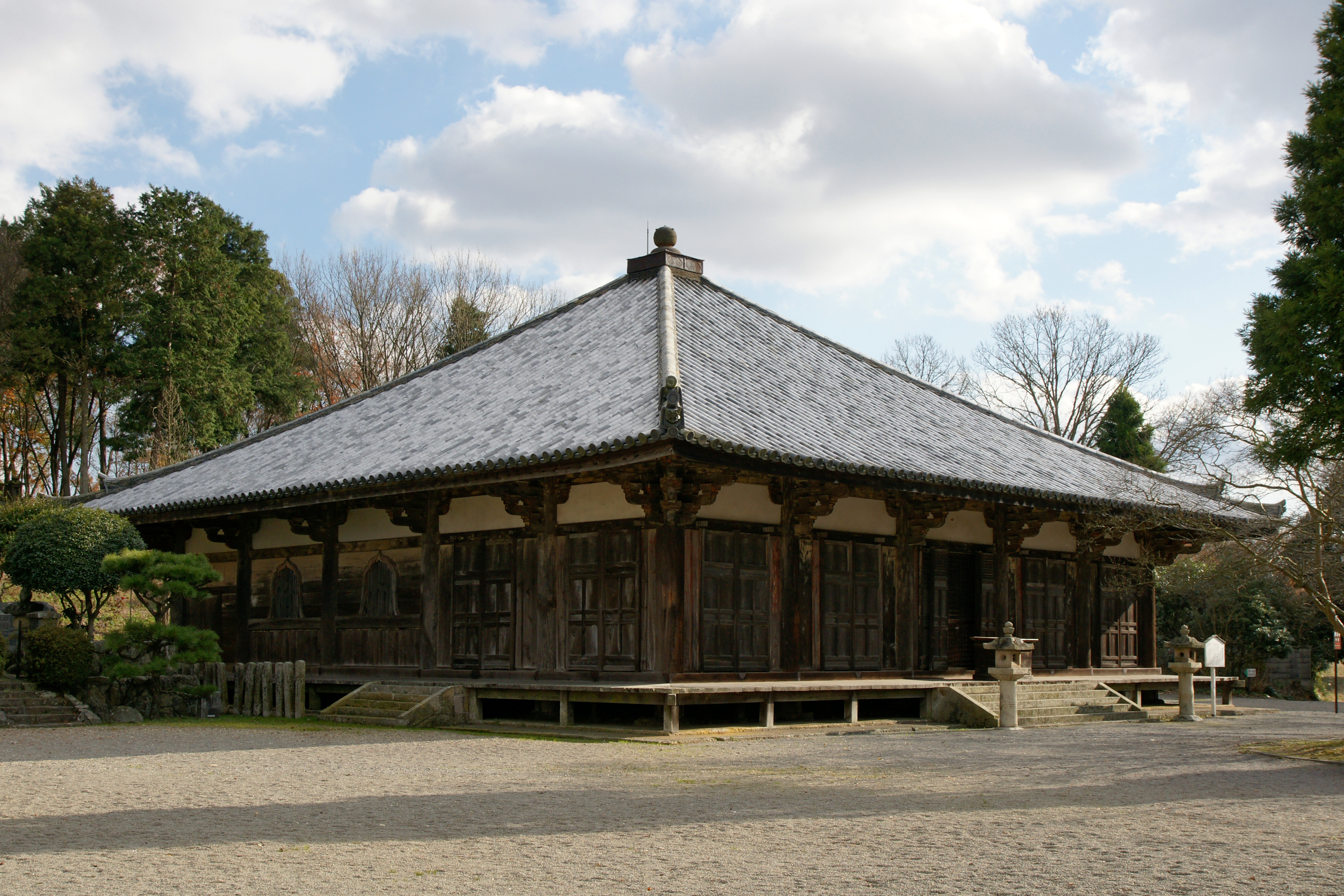
Jōdo-ji's yakushi-dō

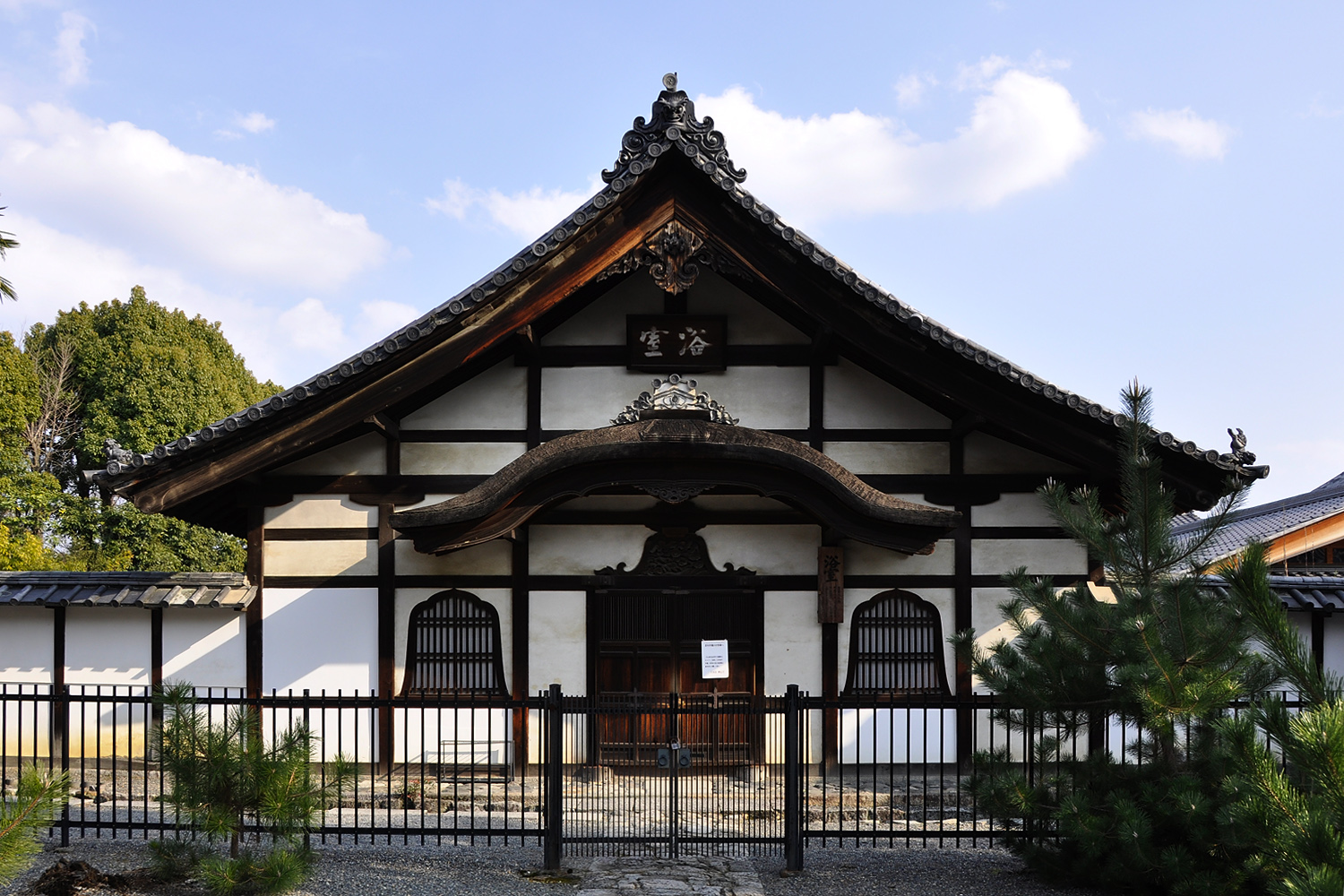
A yokushitsu

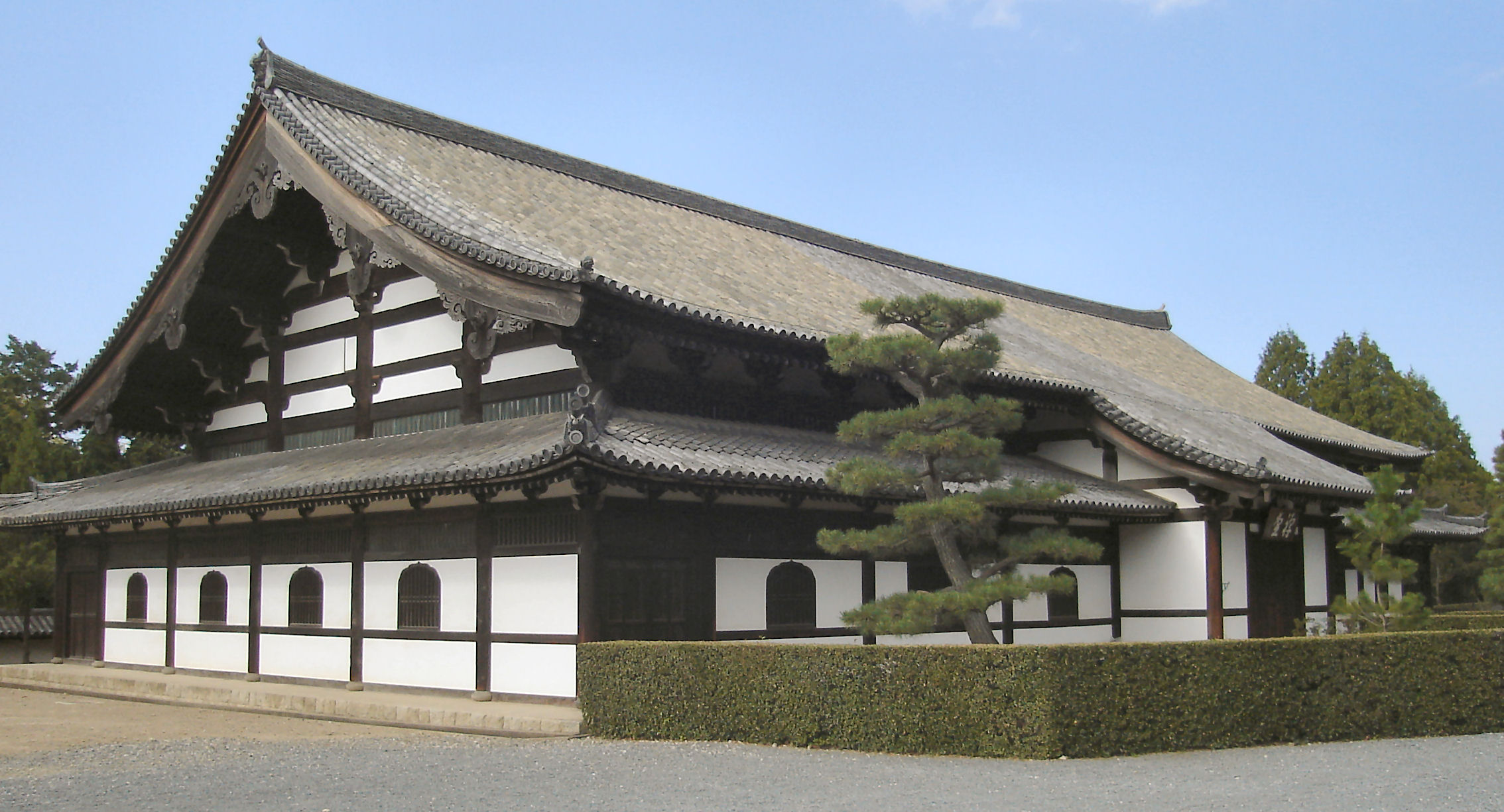
Tōfuku-ji's zen-dō

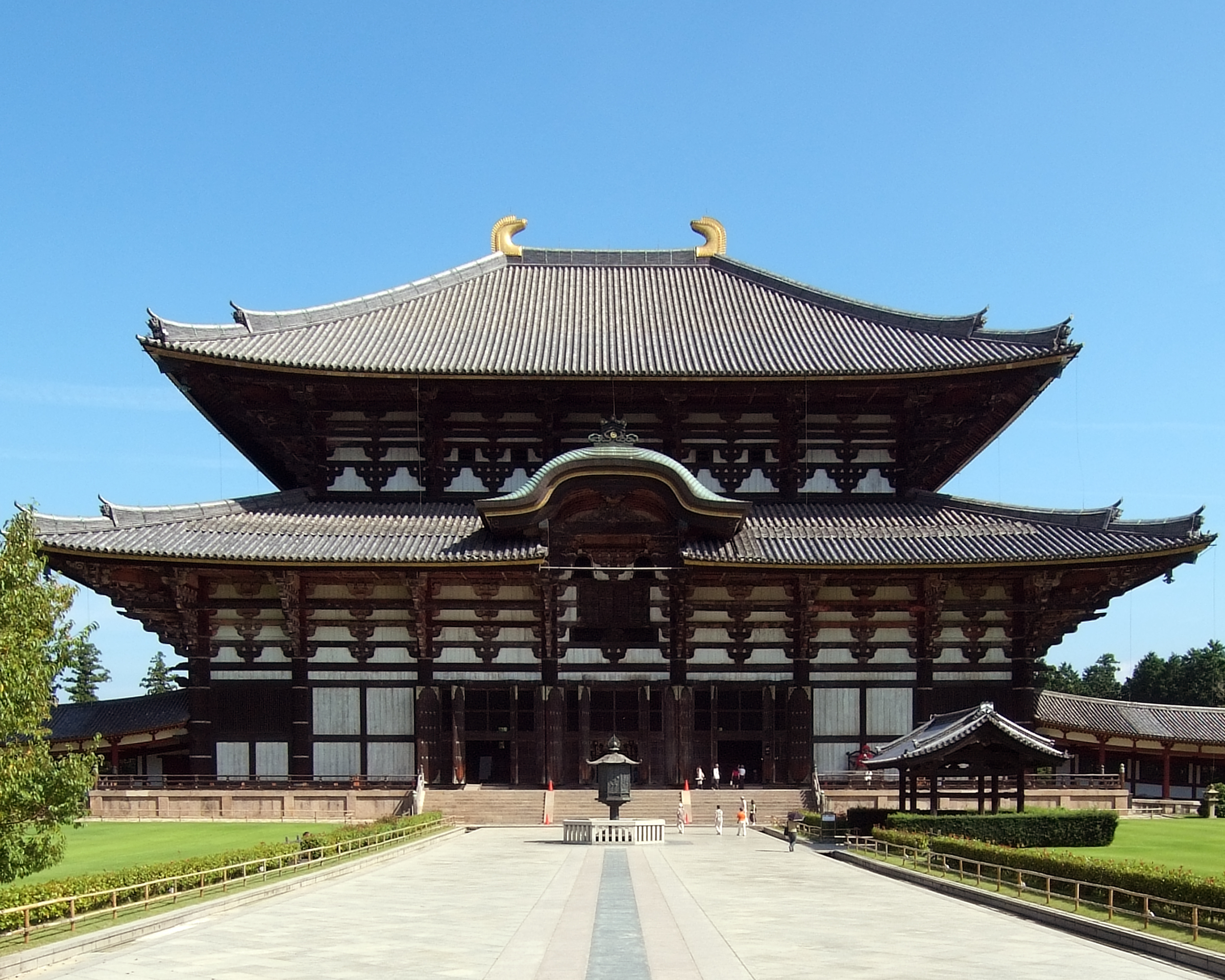
An example of yosemune-zukuri

== See also ==
- Glossary of Buddhism
- Glossary of Shinto
- Diamond Realm
