= Moya (surname) =

Moya is a Spanish and also Catalan surname. Notable people with the surname include:

- Alejandro Moya (born 1969), Cuban filmmaker
- Angel Moya Acosta (born 1964), Cuban political activist
- Carlos Moyà (born 1976), Spanish tennis player
- Edu Moya (born 1981), Spanish footballer
- Eidy Moya (born 1974), Venezuelan boxer
- Enrique Moya (born 1958), Venezuelan author
- Esther Moya (born 1984), Spanish artistic gymnast
- Flavio Moya (born 2005), Chilean footballer
- Frank Moya (1929–2021), American anesthesiologist, businessman, and educator
- Frank Moya Pons, Dominican historian
- Gabriel Moya (baseball) (born 1995), Venezuelan baseball player
- Gabriel Moya (footballer) (born 1966), Spanish footballer
- Gary Moya (born 2001), Chilean footballer
- Héctor Manuel Moya Cessa (born 1966), Mexican scientist
- Hidalgo Moya (1920–1994), American architect
- Horacio Castellanos Moya (born 1957), Salvadoran author
- Isabel Moya (1961–2018), Cuban journalist and professor
- Joaquín Moya (1932–2011), Spanish Olympic fencer
- Jon Moya (born 1983), Spanish footballer
- Jonathan Moya (born 1992), Costa Rican footballer
- Jose Moya del Pino (1891–1969), Spanish-born American painter, muralist and educator
- Juan Moya (1806–1874), Tejano army captain who fought in the Texas Revolution
- Karina Moya (born 1973), Argentine hammer thrower
- Lucas Moya (born 1987), Argentine footballer
- Luis Moya (born 1960), Spanish rally co-pilot
- Mario Moya Palencia (1933–2006), Mexican politician
- Miguel Ángel Moyà (born 1984), Spanish football goalkeeper
- Mike Moya (born 1969), Canadian rock musician
- Patrick Moya (born 1955), French artist
- Pedro Moya de Contreras (1528–1591), Spanish-born archbishop and Viceroy of Mexico
- Pedro de Moya (1610–1660), Spanish painter
- Richard Moya (1932–2017), American politician
- Roberto Moya (born 1965), Cuban discus thrower
- Rodolfo Moya (born 1979), Chilean footballer
- Sabina Moya (born 1977), Colombian javelin thrower
- Salvador Moyà-Solà (born 1955), Spanish anthropologist
- Sandra Moya (born 1974), Puerto Rican track and field athlete
- Sergej Moya (born 1987), German actor
- Víctor Moya (born 1982), Cuban high jumper
- Zenaida Moya, Belizean politician

== See also ==
- Moya (disambiguation)
- Moya (given name)
