= Robert Steiner (radiologist) =

British radiologist

Professor Robert Steiner CBE, FRCR, FRCP, CRCS
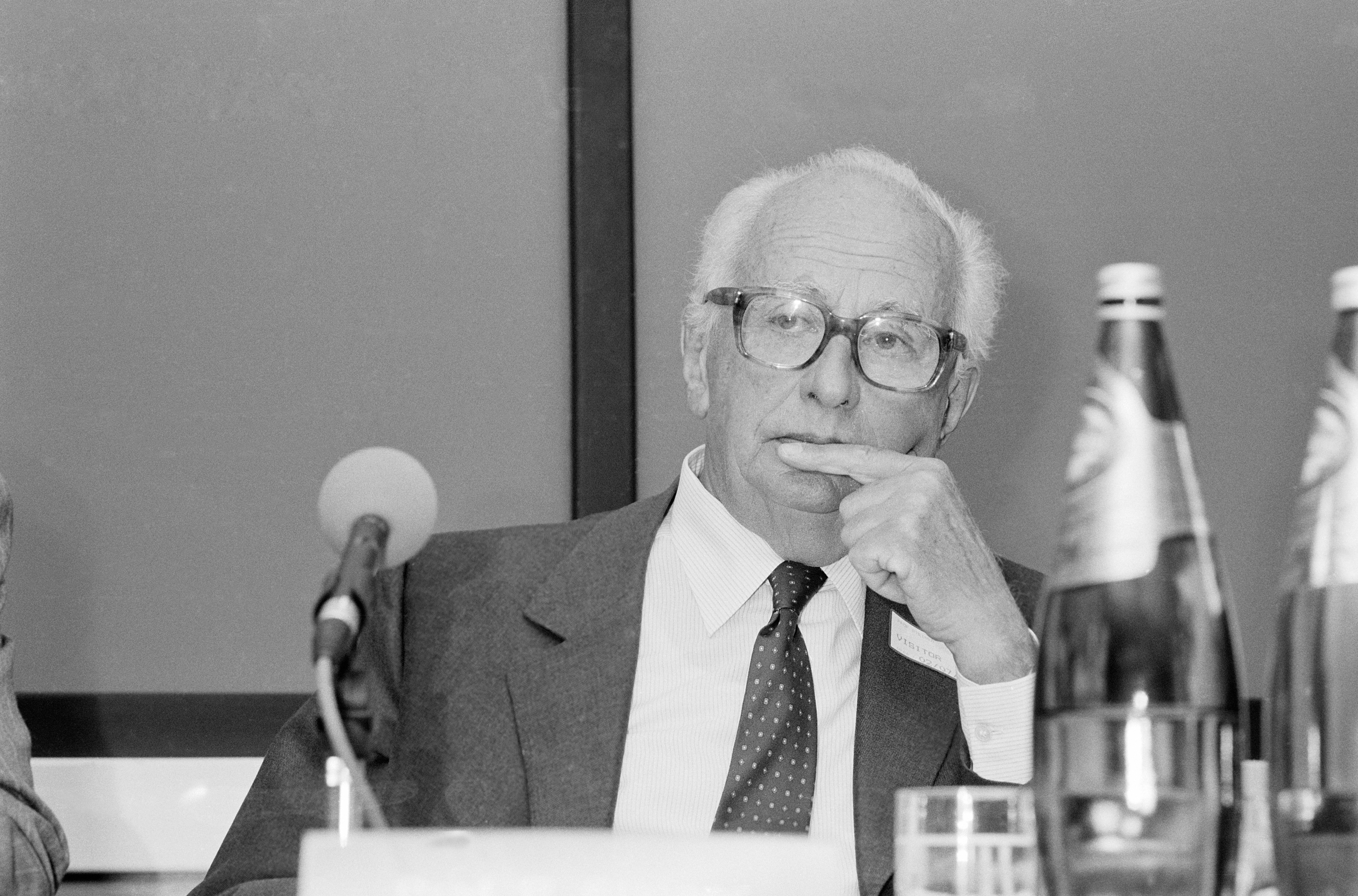
- Steiner in July 1996
- Born: 1 February 1918; Prague
- Died: 12 September 2013 (aged 95)
- Occupation: Radiologist

Professor Robert Emil Steiner CBE FRCR, FRCP, CRCS was a British radiologist.

Steiner was born on 1 February 1918 in Prague. When he was three, his family moved to Vienna. He escaped from Austria shortly after the Anschluss, first to Dublin and then during World War II, to the United Kingdom.

From 1961 to 1983 he worked as Professor of Diagnostic Radiology - their first - at the University of London, and at the Royal Postgraduate Medical School, at Hammersmith Hospital, where after retirement he was emeritus.

He served as editor of the British Journal of Radiology, President of the British Institute of Radiology and President of the Royal College of Radiologists.

He was made a Commander of the Order of the British Empire (CBE) as part of the 1979 Birthday Honours; and received the Royal College of Radiologists' Gold Medal in 1986.

He died on 12 September 2013.
