= Moya =

Moya may refer to:

== People ==
- Moya (given name)
- Moya (surname)

== Places ==
- Moya, Comoros, a town
- Moya, Nigeria, a Local Government Area in Niger State
- Moya District, Peru
- Moya, Cuenca, a municipality in Castilla–La Mancha, Spain
- Moya, Las Palmas, a municipality in the Canary Islands Spain
- Moià (Spanish: Moyá), a municipality in Catalonia, Spain

== Other uses ==
- Moya, a genus of plants, synonym of Maytenus
- Moya (architecture), the core of a building in Japanese architecture
- Museum of Young Art (MOYA), Vienna, Austria, a museum devoted to 21st century art
- Moya (Farscape), a living space ship from the TV series Farscape
- "Moya", the first track of the EP Slow Riot for New Zerø Kanada by Godspeed You! Black Emperor

== See also ==
- Moyamoya disease
- Moja (disambiguation)
