= Main Hall (Japanese Buddhism) =

Main building in Japanese buddhist temples

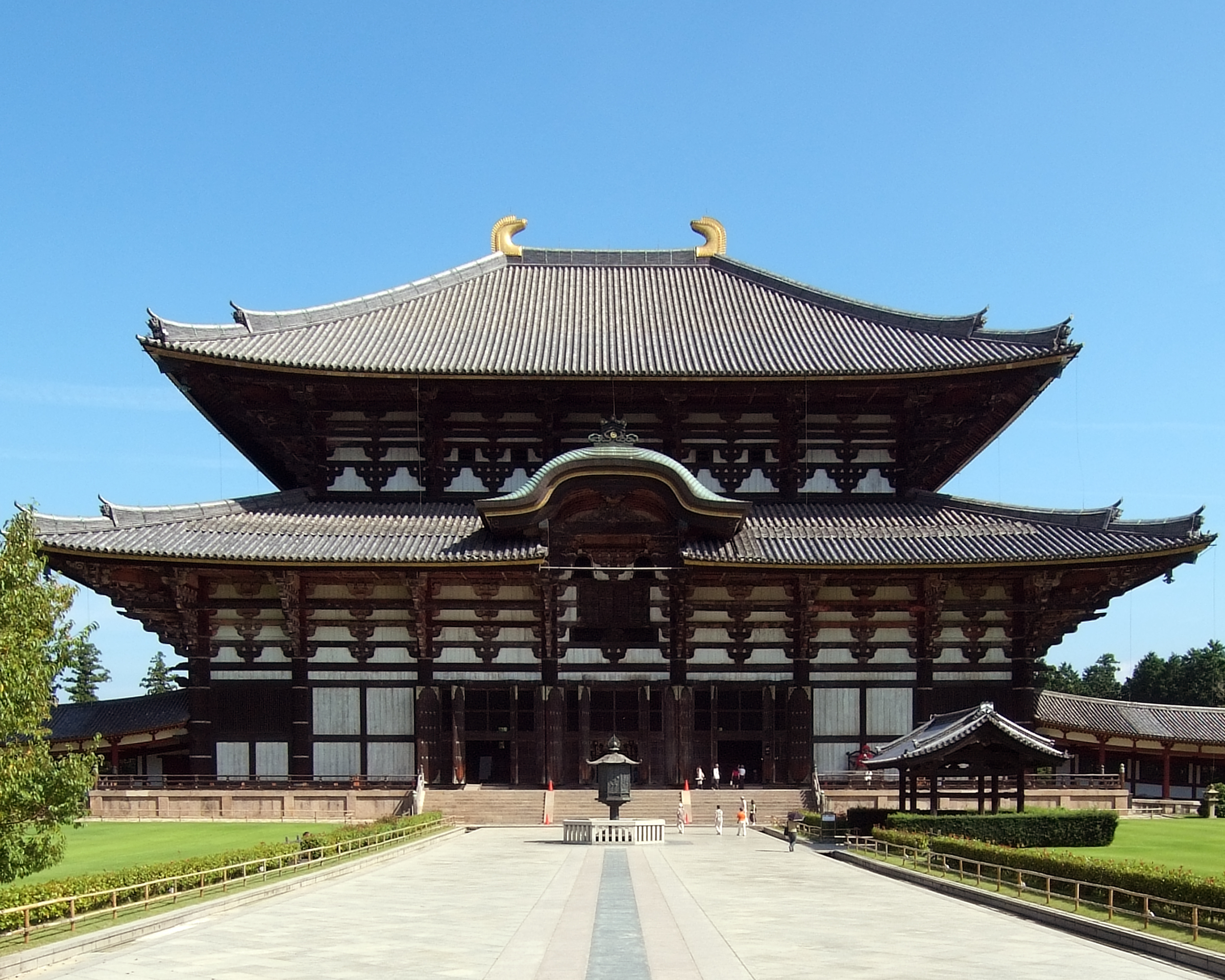
Tōdai-ji's latest "Daibutsuden" reconstructed in 1709 is a 9x7-bay kondō (Japan's National Treasure)

Main hall or Main Temple is the building within a Japanese Buddhist monastery compound (garan) which enshrines the main object of veneration. Because the various denominations deliberately use different terms, this single English term translates several Japanese words, among them butsuden, butsu-dō, kondō, konpon-chūdō, and hondō. Hondō is its exact Japanese equivalent, while the others are more specialized words used by particular sects or for edifices having a particular structure.

== Kondō (Asuka and Nara periods) ==
The term kondō (金堂; lit. 'golden hall / temple') started to be used during the Asuka and Nara periods. A kondō is the centerpiece of an ancient Buddhist temple's garan in Japan. The origin of the name is uncertain, but it may derive from the perceived preciousness of its content, or from the fact that the interior was lined with gold. This is the name used by the oldest temples in the country.

A kondō, for example Hōryū-ji's is a true two-story building with a 3x2-bay central core (moya) surrounded by a 1-bay wide aisles (hisashi), making it 5x4 bays, surrounded by an external 1-bay wide mokoshi, for a total of 9x7 bays. The second story has the same dimensions as the temple's core at the first story, (3x2 bays), but has no mokoshi.

Some temples, for example Asuka-dera or Hōryū-ji, have more than one kondō, but normally only one exists and is the first building to be built. Because of its limited size, worshipers were not allowed to enter the building and had to stand outside. The kondō and a pagoda were usually surrounded by a corridor called kairō.

The use of kondō declined after the 10th century, when it was replaced by a hondō divided in naijin (内陣; inner sanctuary reserved to the deity) and gejin (外陣; space for worshipers, like the nave). The term remained in some use even up to the Edo period, but its frequency decreased drastically after the appearance of the term hon-dō in the Heian period.

== Hondō (Heian period) ==
The term hondō (本堂; lit. 'main hall') (Note: The term hondō is translated as "main hall" in Japanese-English dictionaries. ("Yahoo!辞書 - ほんどう(本堂". Archived from the original on 2012-03-22.)) enshrines the most important objects of veneration. The term is thought to have evolved during the 9th century to avoid the early term kondō, at the time used by six Nara sects: the Nanto Rokushū. It became common after the introduction of the two Mikkyo sects (Tendai and Shingon) to Japan.

Various new types of temple buildings, including the hondō, were built during the Heian period, in response to the requirements of new doctrines. Different buildings were called hondō depending on the sect, for example: the kondō (Shingon), the chudō (Tendai), mieidō (Jōdo), the Amida-dō (Jōdo Shinshū). A notable evolution of the hondō during this period is the inclusion of a space for worshipers inside the hondō itself, called gejin (see above).

Other names such as konpon-chūdō (根本中堂; cardinal central hall) are used as well, for example for the main hall at Mount Hiei's Enryaku-ji. (Note: The hall measures 11x6 bays, of which 11x4 are accessible by the public.) The Tokugawa funeral temple of Kan'ei-ji, which had been built explicitly to imitate Enryaku-ji, also had one, though it has not survived. Yama-dera in Yamagata is another example of a temple using this name.

== Butsuden (Kamakura period) ==
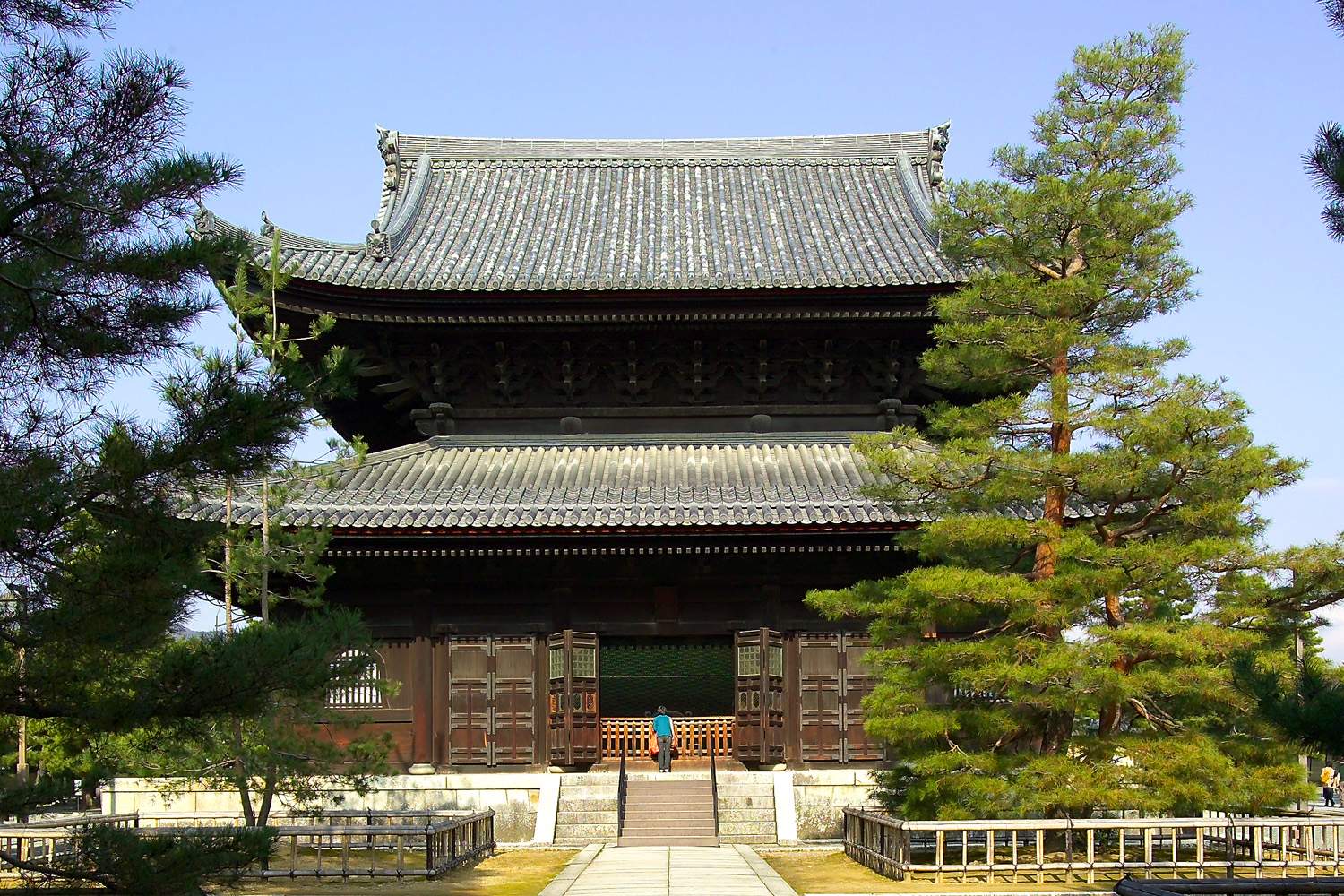
This single-storied Zen butsuden at Myōshin-ji seems to have two stories because of its mokoshi.

The butsuden (仏殿) or butsu-dō (仏堂; both lit. 'Buddha hall') is the main hall of Zen temples of schools such as the Sōtō and Rinzai. This architectonic style arrived together with Zen during the Kamakura period. There are following types of butsuden or butsu-dō:

- The simplest is a 3x3-bay square building. A bay is the space between two pillars, comparable to a Japanese ken (181–197 cm). It has no mokoshi (an enclosure circling the core of the temple covered by a pent roof, usually one bay in width).
- The second type is also 3x3-bay square, but has a 1-bay-wide mokoshi all around the core of the temple, making it look like a two-story, 5x5-bay building as in the case of the butsuden, visible in the photo on the right.
- It is also known that during the 13th and 14th centuries, very large butsuden measuring 5x5 bays square having a mokoshi were built, but none survives. Large size 3x3-bay butsuden with a mokoshi, however, still exist, for example at Myōshin-ji (see photo in the gallery below).

== Edo period ==
In the case of the Ōbaku Zen school that arrived late in Japan, the architecture retained the Ming Chinese style. The hondō of Ōbaku Zen temples is usually called daiyū-hōden (大雄宝殿; lit. 'treasured Mahavira hall'), An example can be found at Mampuku-ji.

== Gallery ==
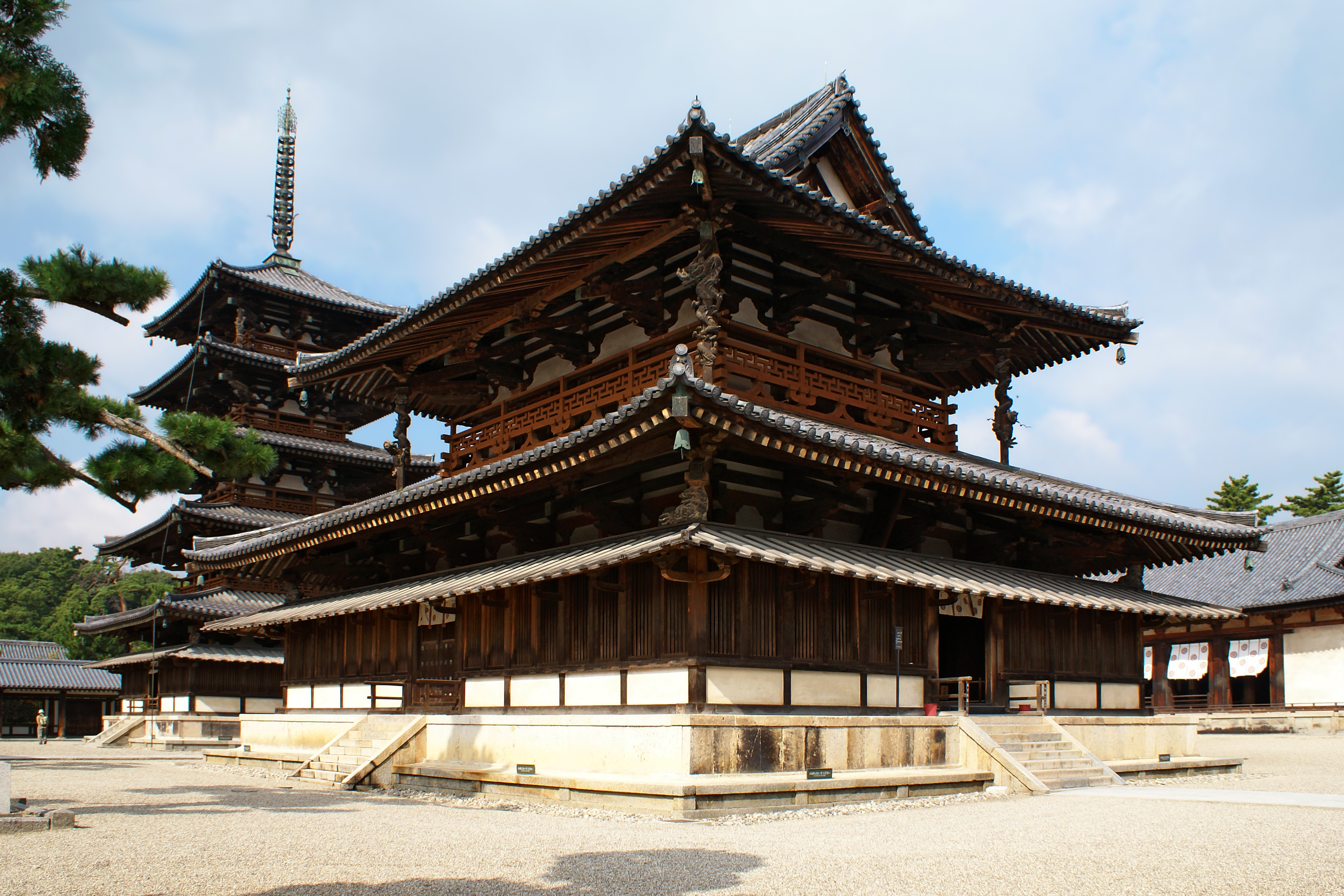
Hōryū-ji's kondō
(Japan's National Treasure)

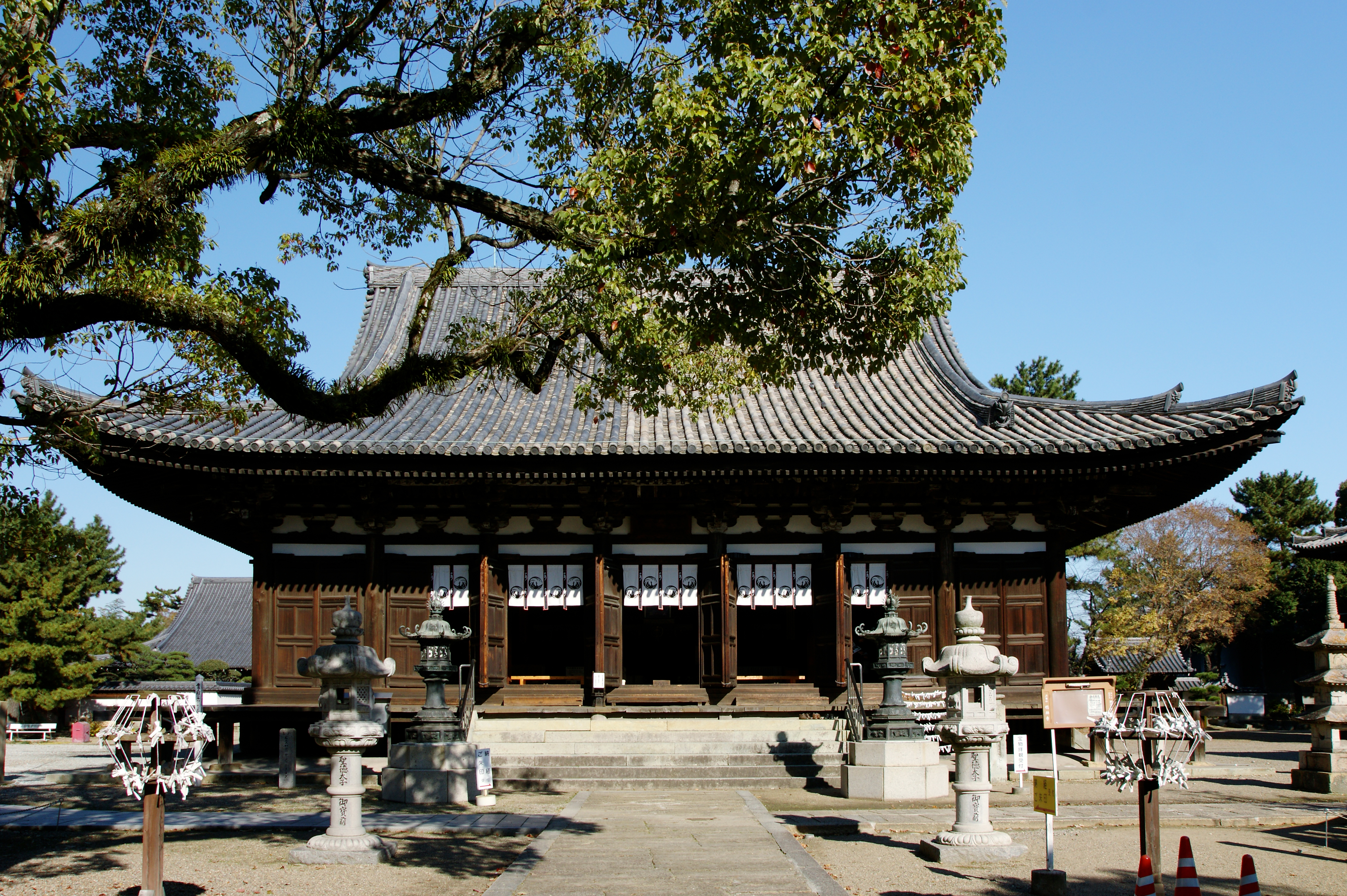
Kakurin-ji's hon-dō
(Japan's National Treasure)

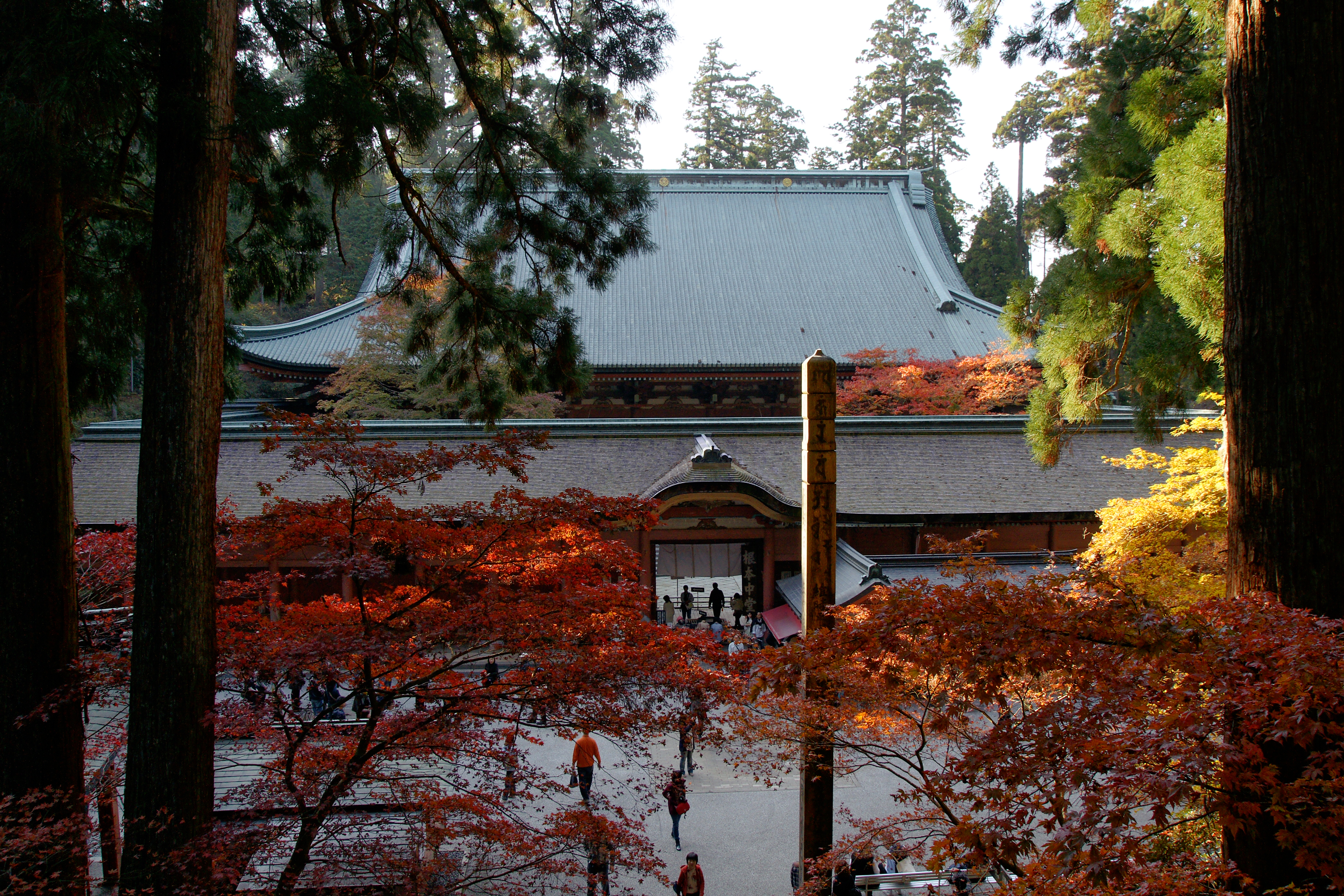
Enryaku-ji's Konponchū-dō
(Japan's National Treasure)

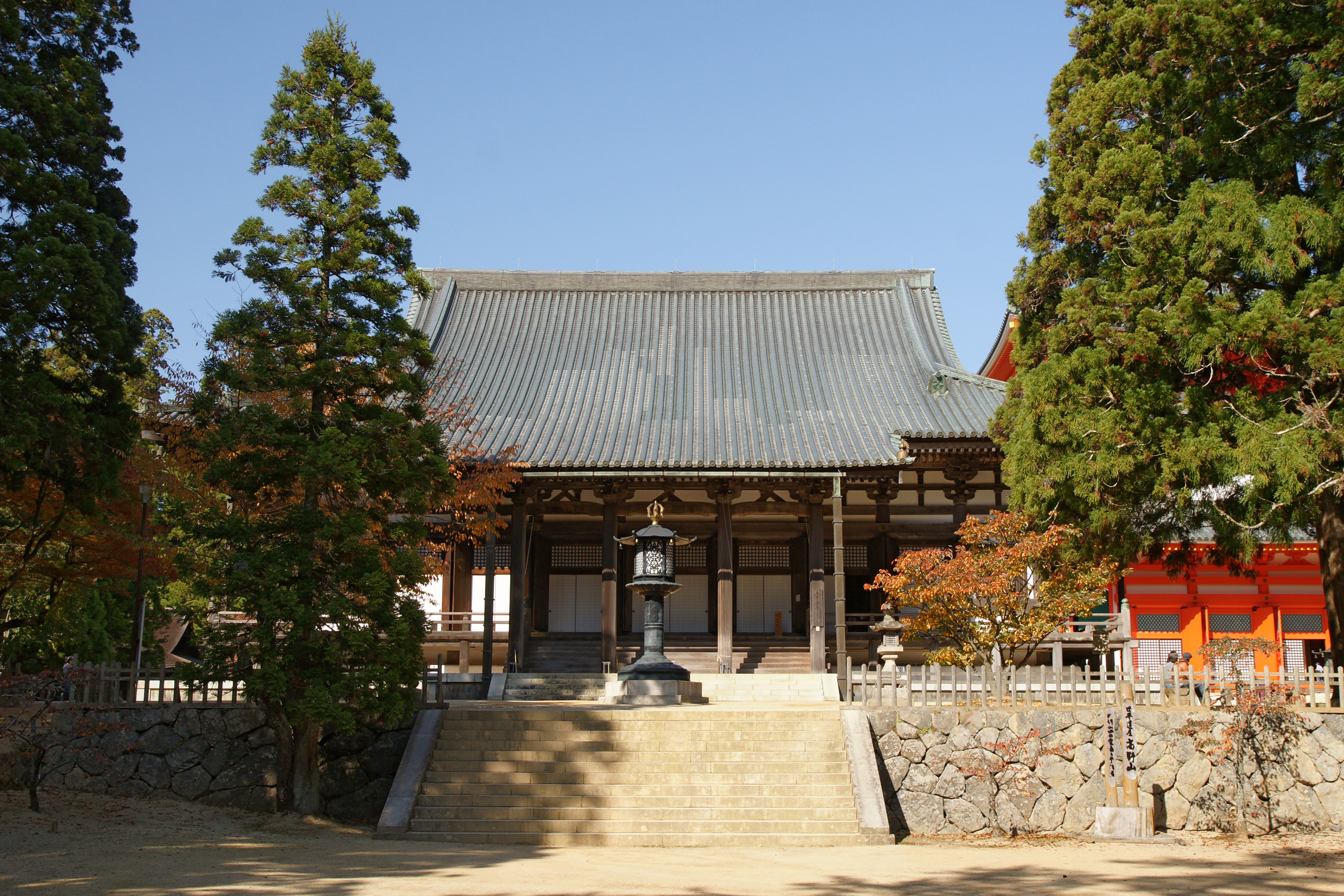
Mt. Kōya's kondō on Danjōgaran

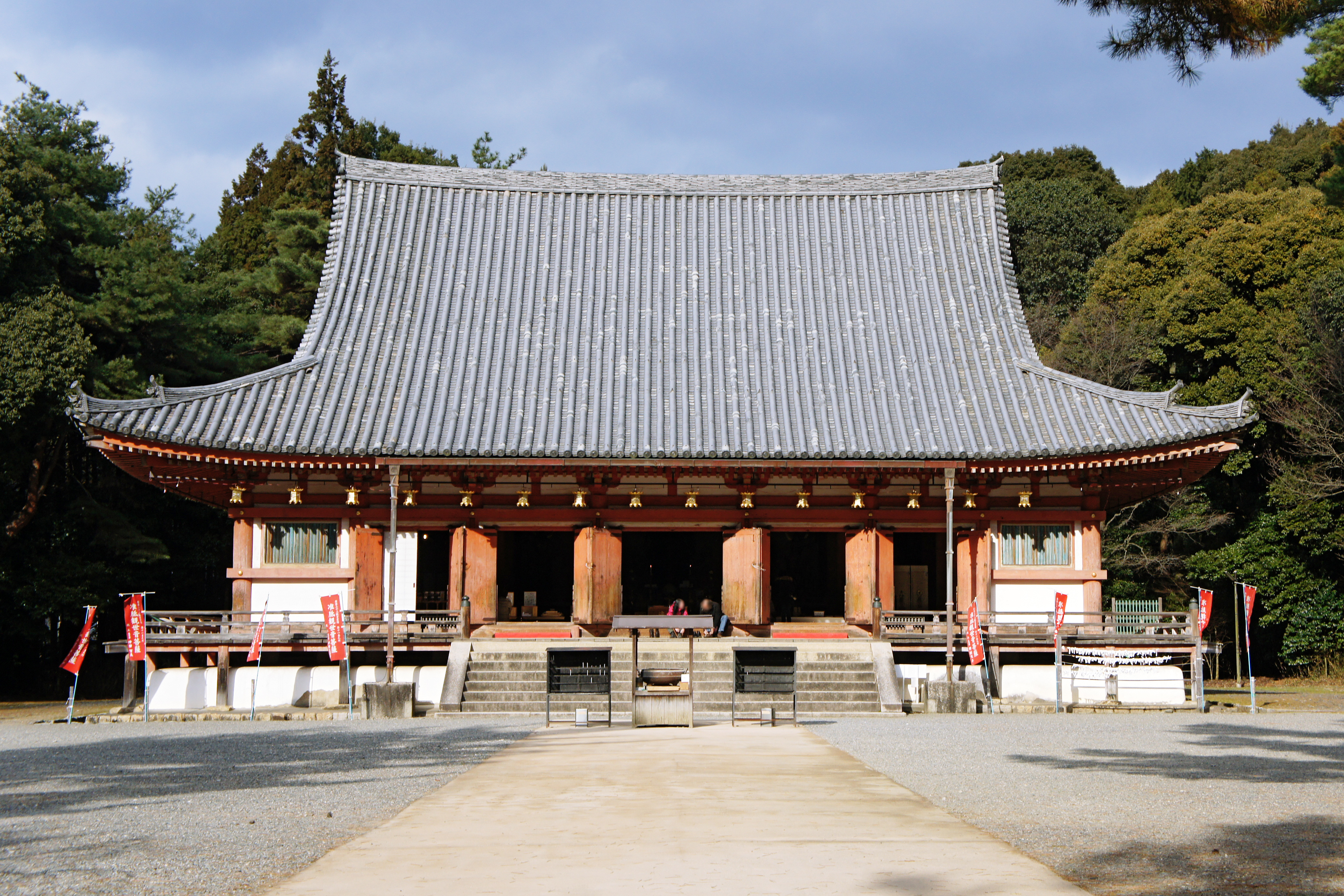
Daigo-ji's kondō
(Japan's National Treasure)

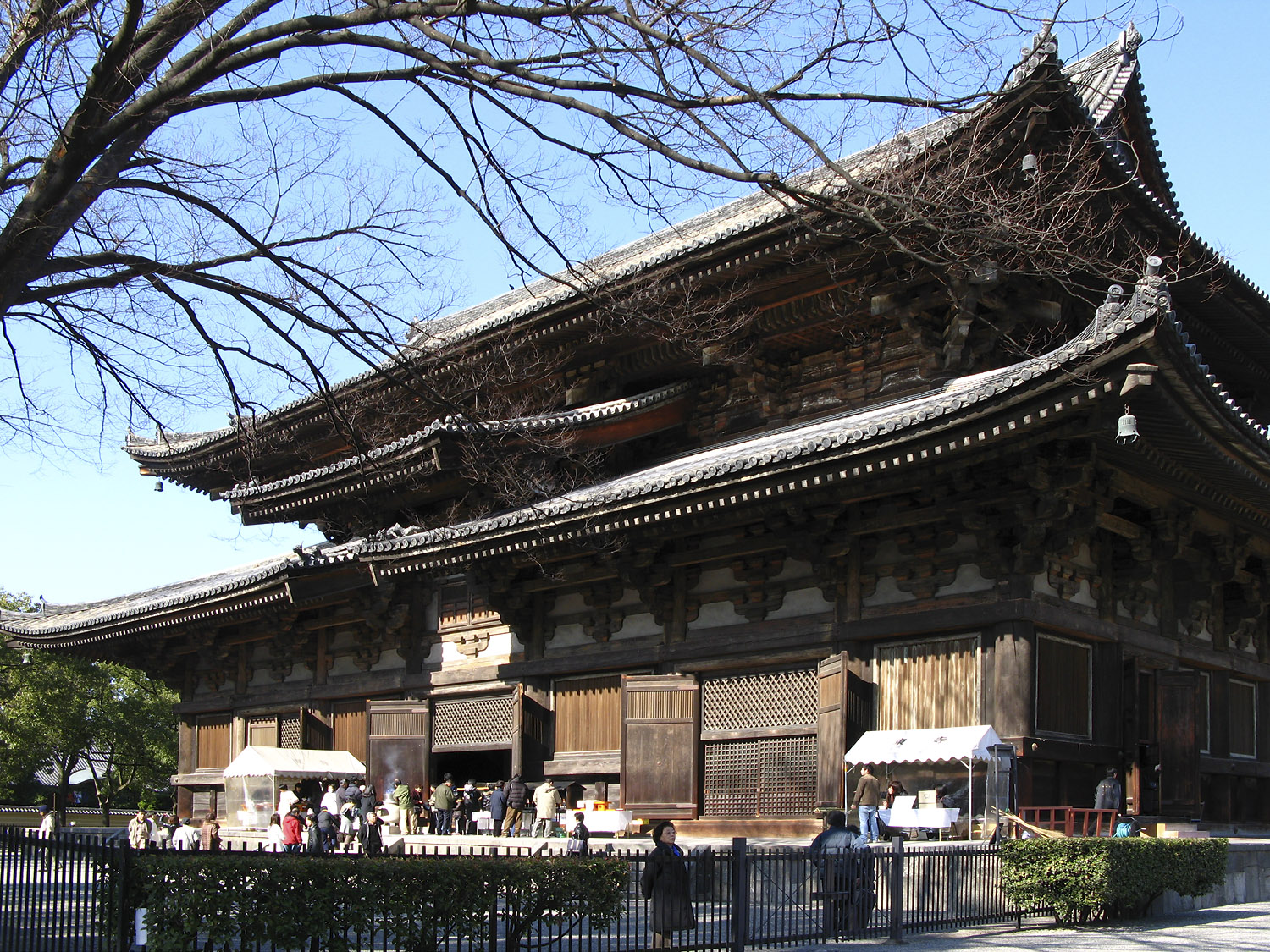
Tō-ji's kondō
(Japan's National Treasure)

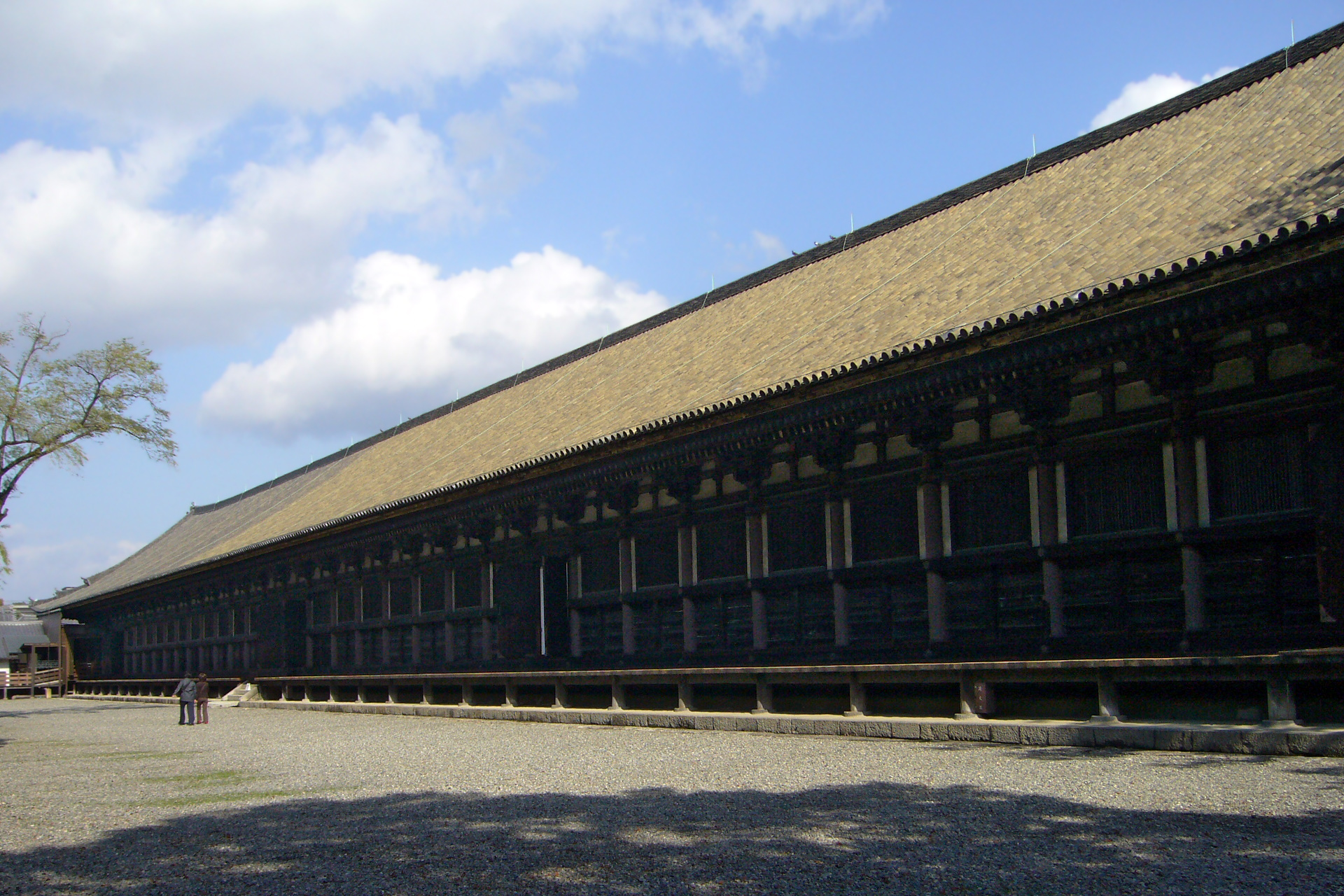
Sanjūsangen-dō's hon-dō
(Japan's National Treasure)

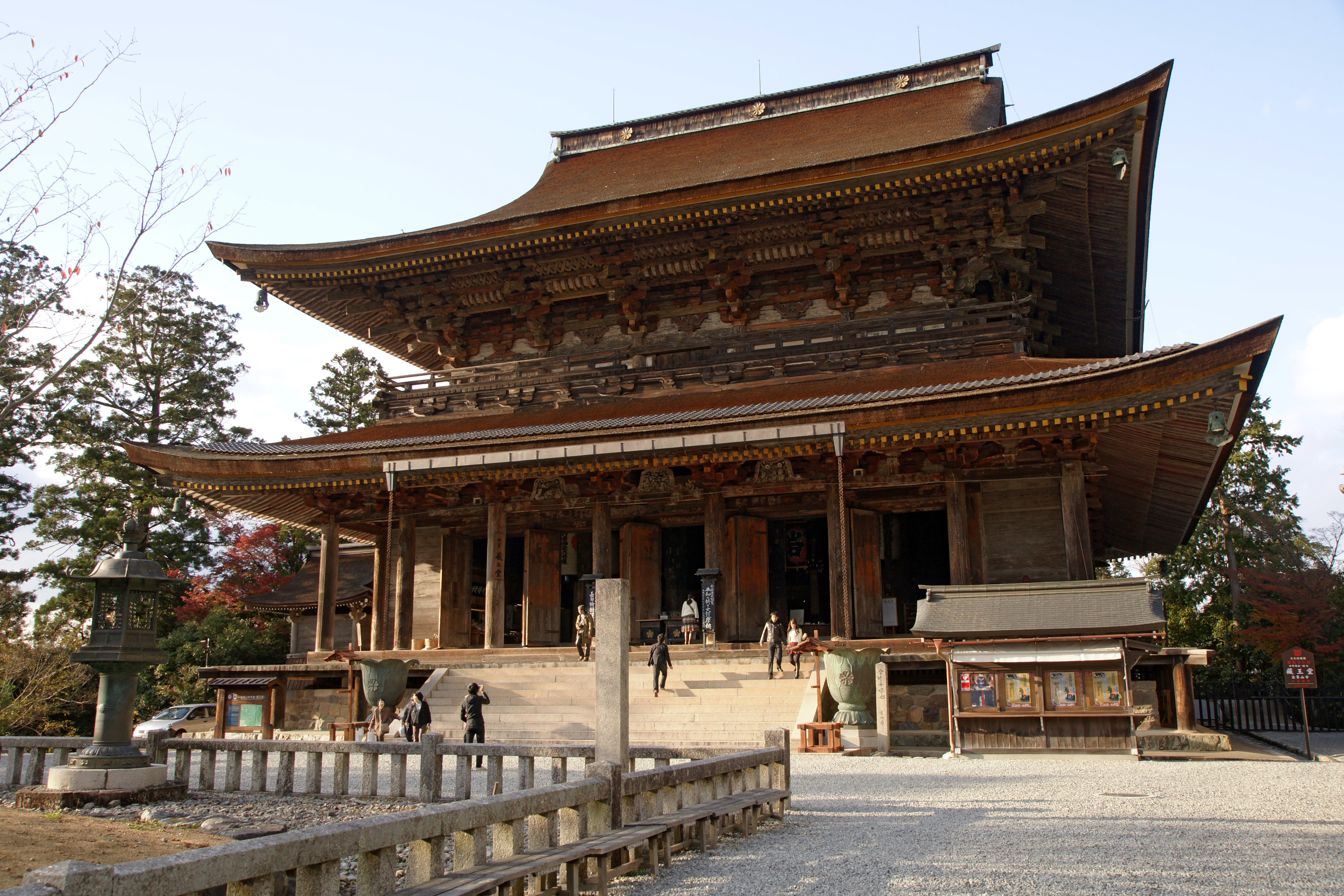
Kinpusenji's Zao-dō (hon-dō)
(Japan's National Treasure)

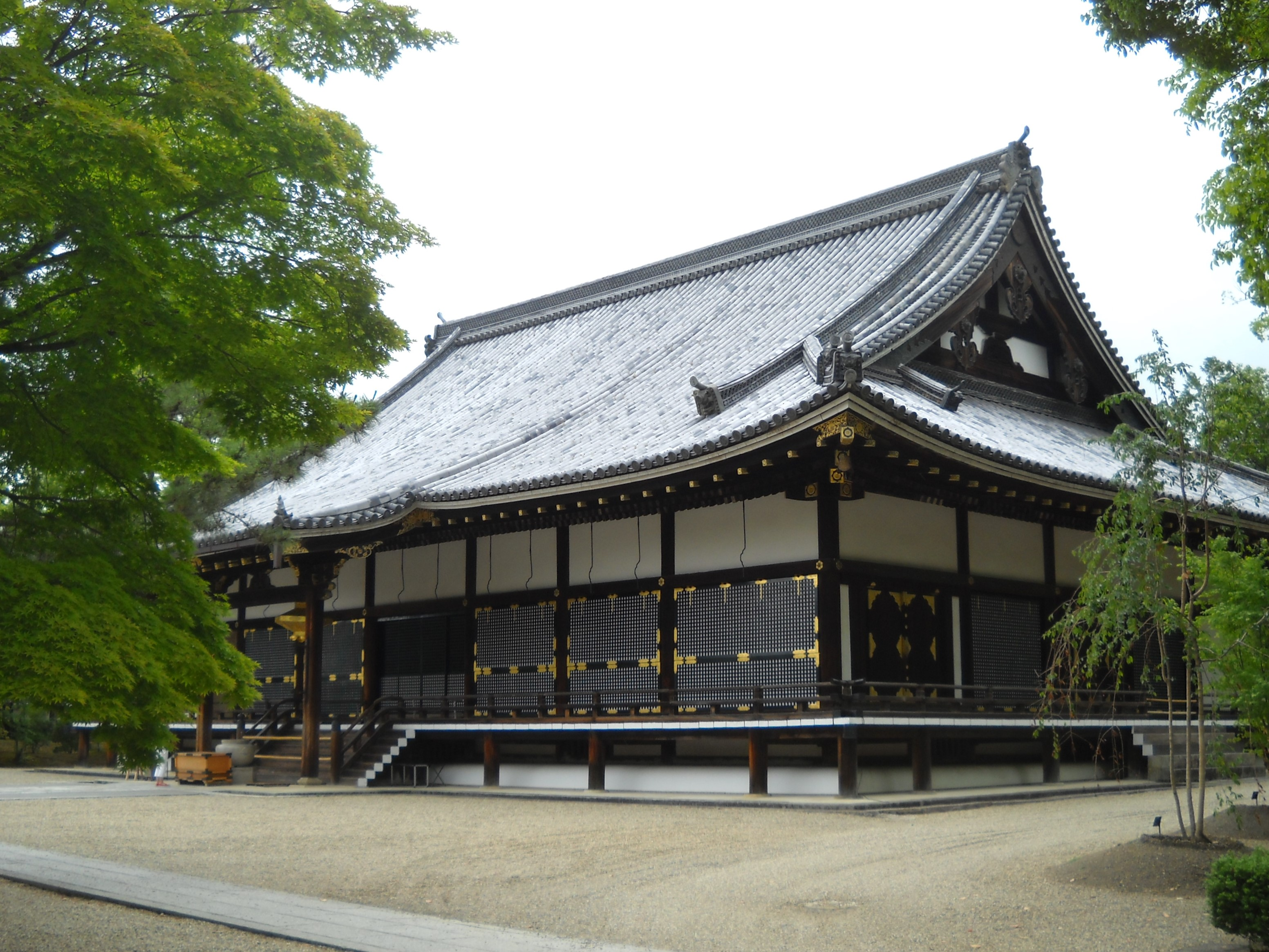
Ninna-ji's kondō
(Japan's National Treasure)

== See also ==
- Shichidō garan for details about the main hall's position within a temple compound.
- The Glossary of Japanese Buddhism for terms concerning Japanese Buddhism, Japanese Buddhist art, and Japanese Buddhist temple architecture.
- Mahavira Hall, the main hall common in Chinese and Korean Buddhist temples as well as temples from the Ōbaku Zen tradition
