= Mokoshi =

Decorative pent roof in Japanese architecture

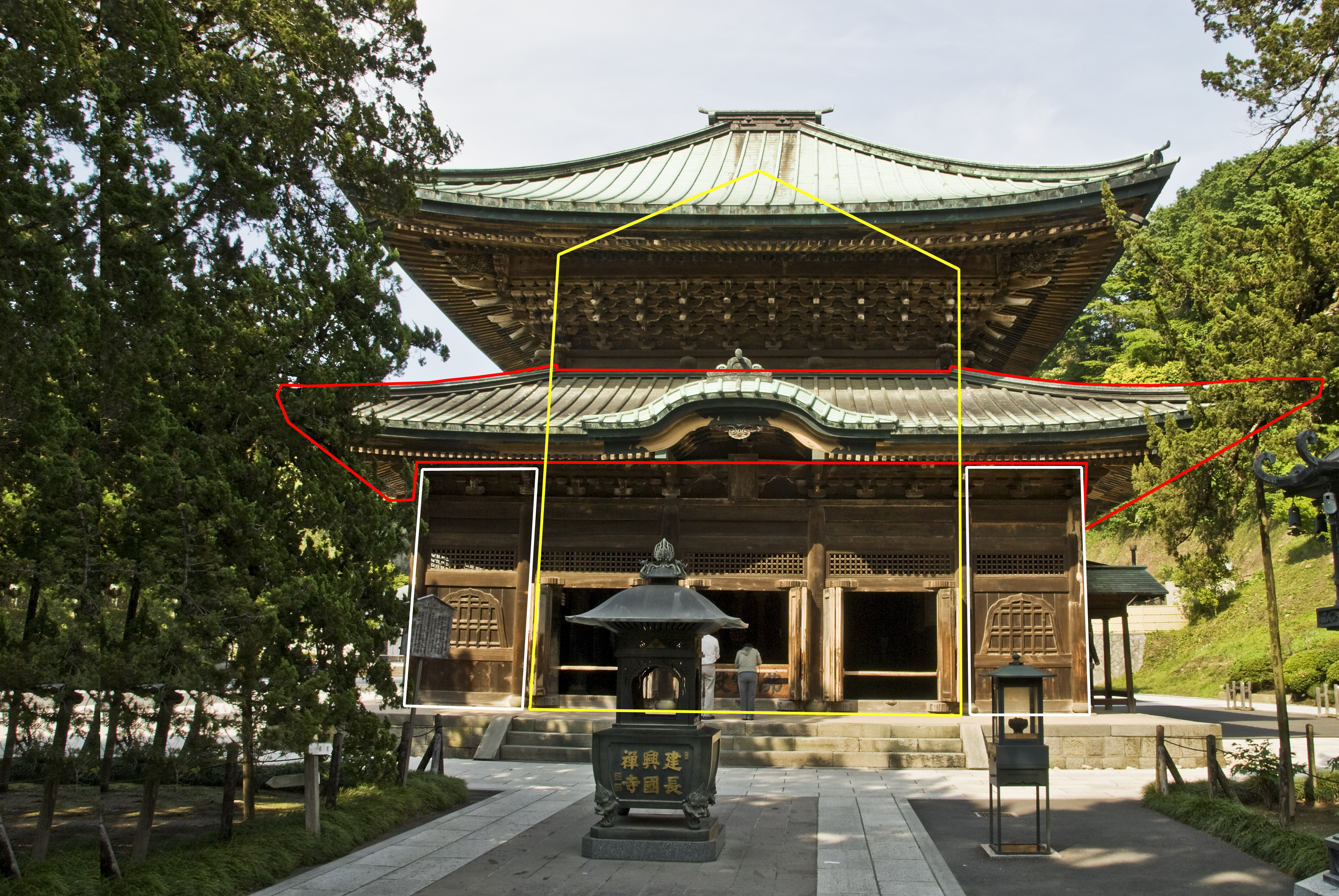
Yellow: moya; red: mokoshi, white: hisashi

In Japanese architecture mokoshi (裳階・裳層; also pronounced shōkai), literally "skirt storey" or "cuff storey", is a decorative pent roof surrounding a building below the true roof. Since it does not correspond to any internal division, the mokoshi gives the impression of there being more floors than there really are. It is usually a ken deep and is most commonly seen in Buddhist temples and pagodas (see for example the article tahōtō). The mokoshi normally covers a hisashi, a walled aisle surrounding a building on one or more sides, but can be attached directly to the core of the structure (the moya), in which case there is no hisashi. The roofing material for the mokoshi can be the same or different (see for example's Hōryū-ji's kon-dō) as in the main roof.

== Origin and purpose ==
The name derives from the fact that it surrounds and hides the main building like the cuff (裳裾, mosuso) of a pair of pants. Its purpose was in fact to hide the thick sustaining pillars of the structure, making it look lighter and simpler. It has been used extensively by the Zen sects in various structures of its temple complexes.

Another name for a mokoshi is yuta (雪打; lit. 'snow strike'), hence the name yuta-zukuri (雪打造, yuta style) given to the style of a building featuring it. This name started being used during the Middle Ages, and stems from the idea that its presence offered protection from snow.

== Significant examples ==
The three storied east pagoda of Yakushi-ji (a National Treasure, see gallery) seems to have six stories because of the presence of a mokoshi between each story.

The first of the kon-dō's (main hall, National Treasure, see gallery) two stories at Hōryū-ji has a mokoshi, which was added in the Nara period with extra posts. These were needed to hold up the original first roof, which extended more than four meters past the building. Hōryū-ji's is the oldest extant example of mokoshi.

The butsuden (main hall) of a Zen temple usually has a mokoshi, and therefore looks like a two-story building (see photo above and gallery), although in fact it is not.

== Gallery ==
The following structures all have a mokoshi.

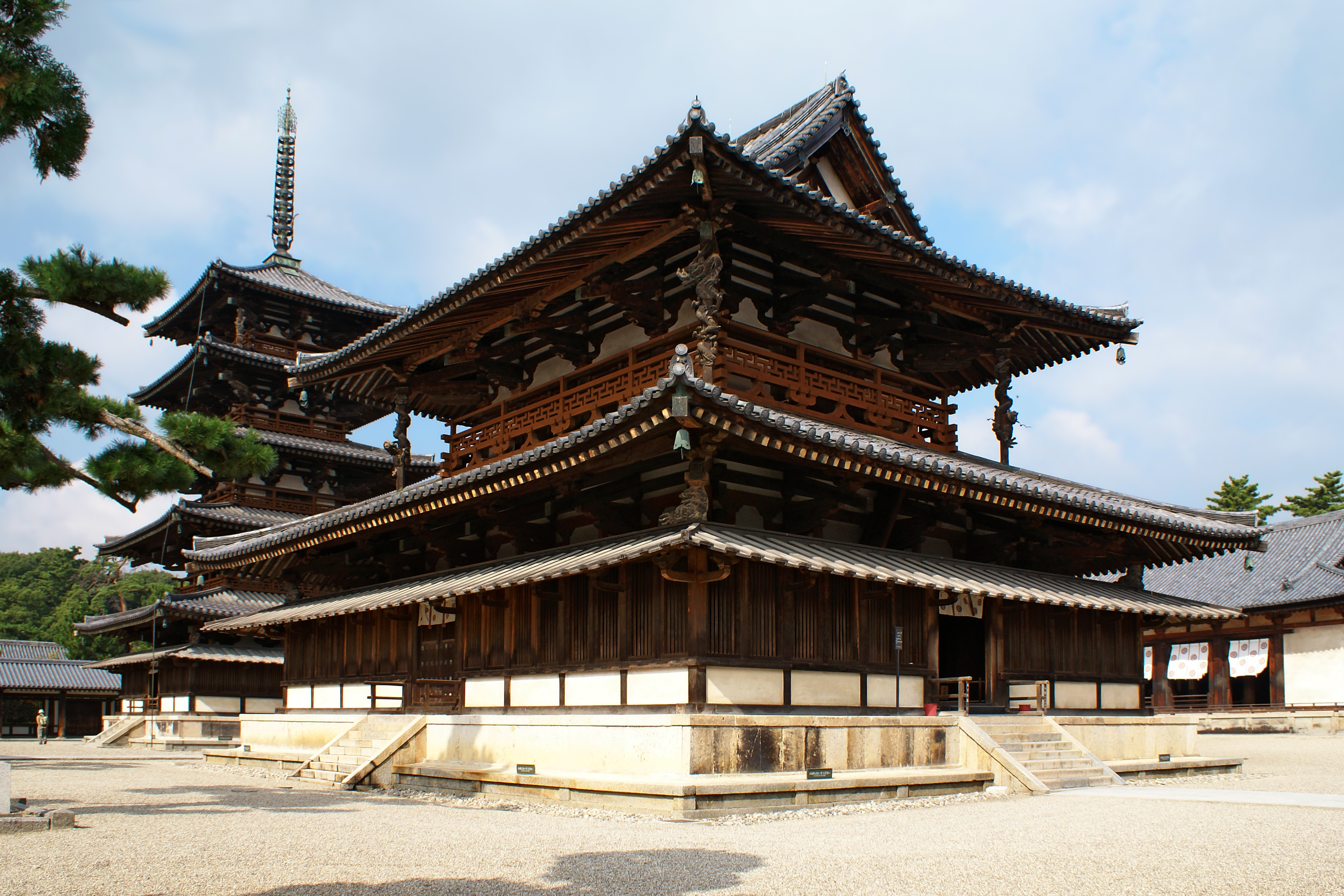
Hōryū-ji's kon-dō

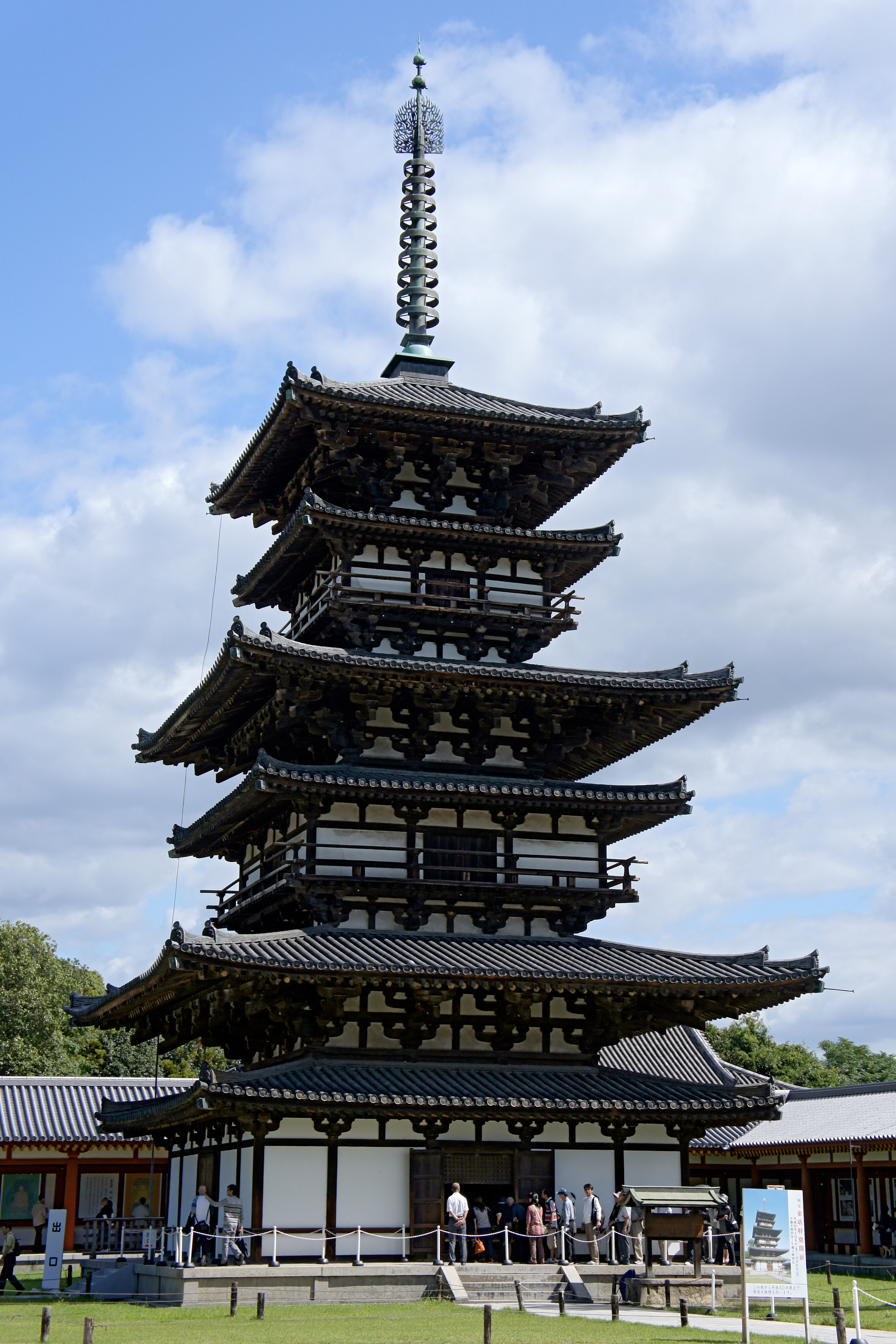
Yakushi-ji's three-storied east pagoda

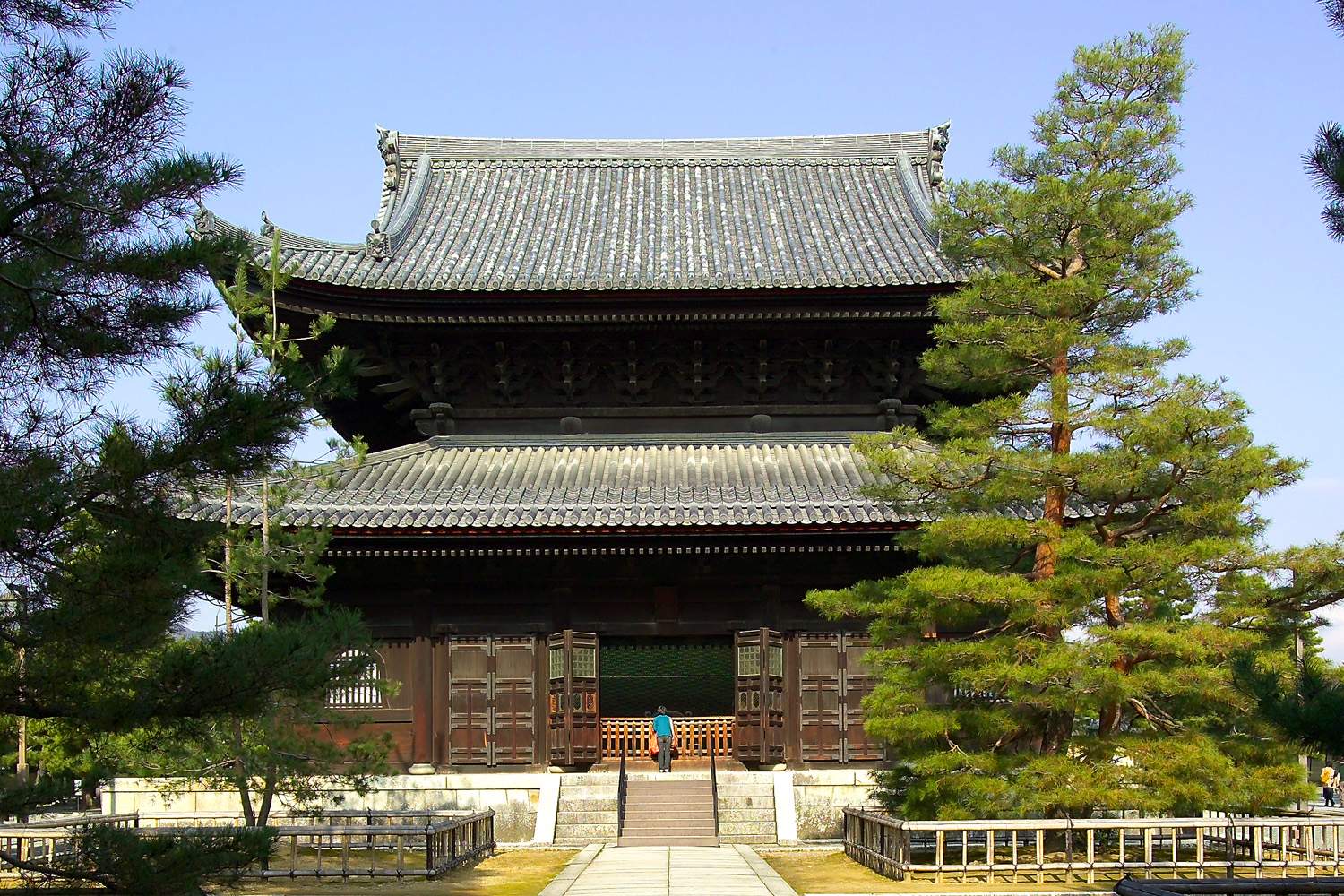
Myōshin-ji's butsuden

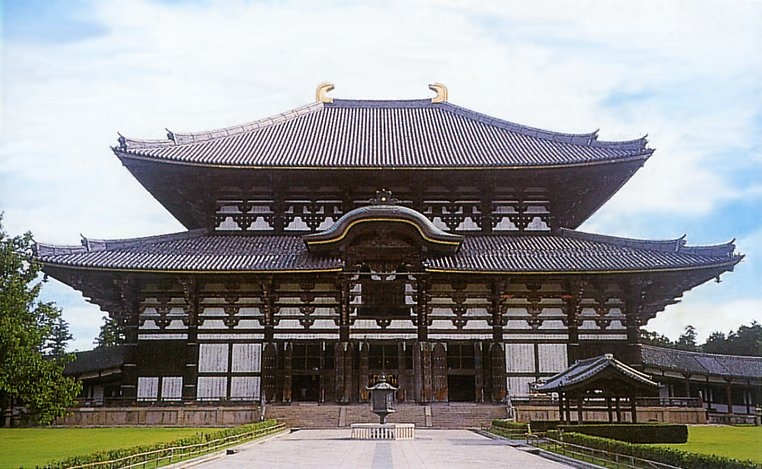
Tōdai-ji's Daibutsuden

== See also ==
- List of roof shapes
