= BJR =

BJR can refer to:

- Born Just Right, American Record & Film Producer
- Brad Jones Racing, an Australian V8 Supercar motor racing team
- British Journal of Radiology, an official peer reviewed journal of The British Institute of Radiology
- Business judgment rule, a Corporate law concept
- Beijing Renmin Guangbo Diantai, a chain of Chinese radio stations
