= Frank Ellis (radiologist) =

British radiologist

Frank Ellis OBE (22 August 1905 – 3 February 2006) was a world leader in the treatment of cancer by radiation therapy.

== Early life ==
He was born in Sheffield, England and was educated at King Edward VII School and the University of Sheffield.

== Career ==
He subsequently worked as a radiation oncologist at Weston Park Hospital, Sheffield. In 1943 he became the first director of the Radiotherapy Department at the Royal London Hospital. In 1950 he established the Radiotherapy Department at the Churchill Hospital, Oxford. After retiring in 1970, he held visiting professorial appointments at the University of Southern California, in Wisconsin and at the Memorial Sloane-Kettering Institute in New York.

Ellis was President of the British Institute of Radiology.

== Later life ==
He was active until very close to his death. He died on 3 February 2006 in the Churchill Hospital. There was a memorial service for him at Wolfson College, Oxford, on 17 June 2006.

== Honours and awards ==
He was awarded the Gold Medal of the Royal College of Radiologists in 1987. In the 2000 New Year Honours, he was made an Officer of the Order of the British Empire (OBE) for services to the development of Radiology. Ellis was also a Fellow of the Royal College of Physicians, the Royal College of Radiologists and the American College of Radiology. The Frank Ellis Medal of the Royal College of Radiologists is awarded in his honour and a lecture in his name was held five times 2005–2015.

In 2005, at the age of 100, he received an honorary doctorate from Sheffield University in person. attending the centenary celebrations at the University of Sheffield in 2005 and the Old Edwardians dinner in 2005.
