= Catharine West =

British Professor

Catharine West is a British cancer researcher who specialised in radiation biology. She is an emeritus professor at the University of Manchester, where she worked from 2002 until 2022.

== Education ==
In 1978, West completed a Bachelor of Arts degree at the University of York, followed by a Doctor of Philosophy (Ph.D.) in 1983 at The Institute of Cancer Research (within the University of London). Her doctoral dissertation was titled The effect of cytotoxic drugs and radiation on mammalian cells and multicellular spheroid in vitro.

== Career ==
From 1983 to 1985, West worked as a Postdoctoral Fellow in the Cancer Centre at the University of Rochester in New York. This was followed by a number of appointments at the Paterson Institute for Cancer Research where she worked for 16 years, first as a scientist and then as a senior scientist. In 2002, she moved to the University of Manchester where she worked until her retirement in December 2022. During her time at the University of Manchester, West established the Translational Radiobiology Group, taught postgraduate courses in radiobiology, examined internal and external examinees, and supervised students studying doctoral degrees in medicine.

In March 2023, The University of Manchester organised an international conference called Wisdom from The West, to honour West for her contributions to the field of radiobiology. During the conference, many international delegates talked about their experience working with Prof. West. At the end of the conference, she shared her experience with the community and provided 15 Radiobiology Research Principles that she learned over the years.

=== Research ===
West's research focused on predicting radiosensitivity and hypoxia in tissues of cancer patients post-radiotherapy. She developed an interest in the use of human genomics data to personalise radiotherapy to minimise radiation toxicity in cancer patients.

In November 2009, the Radio-Genomics Consortium was established under the American National Cancer Institute, in order to identify genetic determinants of radiotherapy toxicity. West and Barry Rosenstein (from the Icahn School of Medicine in New York) were appointed as the lead investigators for the consortium. The aim of the consortium is to characterise the individual molecular profiles that reflect relevant biological phenotypes, to help predict tumour and normal tissue response to radiation.

=== Awards and fellowships ===
In 2016, West was received the Weiss Medal from the UK Association for Radiation Research, for setting up the REQUITE international consortium. In 2017, West received the Bacq and Alexander Award from the European Radiation Research Society.

West has received honorary fellowships from the British Institute of Radiology and from the Royal College of Radiologists in 2018.

== Publications ==
West's most-cited publications include:

- Normal tissue reactions to radiotherapy: towards tailoring treatment dose by genotype. Nat Rev Cancer 9, 134–142 (2009)
- Association analyses of more than 140,000 men identify 63 new prostate cancer susceptibility loci. Nat Genet. 2018 Jul;50(7):928-936
- Carbonic Anhydrase (CA IX) Expression, a Potential New Intrinsic Marker of Hypoxia: Correlations with Tumor Oxygen Measurements and Prognosis in Locally Advanced Carcinoma of the Cervix1. Cancer research 61 (17), 6394–6399
