= Moja =

Moja may refer to:

== People ==
- Federico Moja (1802–1885), Italian painter
- Giuseppe Moja (1915–2009), Salesian priest and missionary in India
- Hella Moja (1896–1951), German screenwriter, film producer and film actress

== Other ==
- Moja (chimpanzee)
- Möja, Sweden
- Moja TV, Bosnian IPTV provider
- Movement for Justice in Africa

== See also ==
- Moya (disambiguation)
