= Joanna Wardlaw =

Scottish physician, radiologist

Joanna Wardlaw CBE FRCP FRSE FMedSci FRCR
- Born: 4 November 1958 (age 67); London, England
- Citizenship: United Kingdom
- Education: Park School, Glasgow; University of Edinburgh
- Occupations: radiologist, clinical researcher, academic
- Medical career
- Institutions: Institute of Neurological Sciences, Glasgow; University of Edinburgh; NHS Lothian
- Sub-specialties: Radiology
- Research: Neuroradiology; neuroimaging; pathophysiology; strokes

Joanna Marguerite Wardlaw (born 4 November 1958) is a Scottish physician, radiologist, and academic specialising in neuroradiology and pathophysiology. Wardlaw worked as a junior doctor before specialising as a radiologist. She continues to practice medicine as an Honorary Consultant Neuroradiologist with NHS Lothian. She has spent her entire academic career at the University of Edinburgh.

== Early life and education ==
Wardlaw was born on 4 November 1958 in London, England. She was educated at Park School, an all-girls school in Glasgow, Scotland. She read medicine at the University of Edinburgh, taking a first class BSc in 1979, and Bachelor of Medicine, Bachelor of Surgery (MBChB) in 1982. In 1994, she completed a Doctor of Medicine (MD). Her doctoral thesis concerned the pathophysiology and treatment of ischaemic stroke, and was titled "Imaging and treatment of acute ischaemic stroke: the application and verification of non-invasive imaging techniques in the investigation and treatment of acute ischaemic stroke".

== Career and research ==
Having worked as a junior doctor, Wardlaw specialised as a radiologist. In 1986 she became a Member of the Royal Colleges of Physicians of the United Kingdom (MRCP), and in 1988 a Fellow of both the Royal College of Physicians (FRCP) and the Royal College of Radiologist (FRCR). From 1992 to 1994 she worked as a consultant neuroradiologist at the Institute of Neurological Sciences in Glasgow (now part of Queen Elizabeth University Hospital). Since 1994 she has been an honorary consultant neuroradiologist with NHS Lothian.

From 1994 to 1998, Wardlaw was a MRC senior lecturer at the University of Edinburgh. In 1997 or 1998, she established the Brain Imaging Research Centre at the university, now grouped with the Clinical Research Imaging Centre into Edinburgh Imaging and continues to serve as its director. She was a Reader from 1998 to 2001. She has been Head of the Division of Neuroimaging since 2001. She was appointed to a personal chair as Professor of Applied Neuroimaging in 2002. She was the founding director of the Scottish Imaging Network: A Platform for Scientific Excellence (SINAPSE), leading the organisation until 2010.

Wardlaw is recognised as an expert in brain blood vessel diseases and neuroimaging. Her current research is focused on the prevention, diagnosis, and treatment of strokes, particularly cerebral small vessel diseases. She is also interested in the use of imaging in pathophysiology.

== Awards and honours ==
In 2005, Wardlaw was elected a Fellow of the Academy of Medical Sciences (FMedSci). In 2011 she was elected a Fellow of the Royal Society of Edinburgh (FRSE), Scotland's national academy of science and letters. She was made a Fellow of the American Heart Association in 2014. In the 2016 New Year Honours, she was appointed a Commander of the Order of the British Empire (CBE) "for services to neuroimaging and clinical science".

In 2008, Wardlaw was awarded the President's Medal of the British Society of Neuroradiologists. In May 2017, she was awarded the Presidential Award of the European Stroke Organisation. In 2018, she received both the Karolinska Stroke Award for Lifetime Contribution to Excellence in Advancing Knowledge in Stroke and the American Stroke Associations' William M. Feinberg Award for Excellence in Clinical Stroke.

== Selected works ==
- Hankey, Graeme J.; Wardlaw, Joanna M. (2002). Clinical neurology. London: Manson. ISBN 978-1840760101.
- Warlow, Charles P.; van Gijn, Jan; Dennis, Martin S.; Wardlaw, Joanna M.; Bamford, John M.; Hankey, Graeme J.; Sandercock, Peter A. G.; Rinkel, Gabriel; Langhorne, Peter; Sudlow, Cathie; Rothwell, Peter (2008). Stroke: practical management (3rd ed.). Malden, MA: Blackwell Publishing. ISBN 978-1405127660.
- Wardlaw, Joanna M.; Doubal, Fergus; Armitage, Paul; Chappell, Francesca; Carpenter, Trevor; Muñoz Maniega, Susana; Farrall, Andrew; Sudlow, Cathie; Dennis, Martin; Dhillon, Baljean (February 2009). "Lacunar stroke is associated with diffuse blood-brain barrier dysfunction". Annals of Neurology. 65 (2): 194–202. doi:10.1002/ana.21549. PMID 19260033. S2CID 25226289.
- Sandercock, PAG; Wardlaw, JM; Lindley, RI (June 2012). "The benefits and harms of intravenous thrombolysis with recombinant tissue plasminogen activator within 6 h of acute ischaemic stroke (the third international stroke trial [IST-3]): a randomised controlled trial". The Lancet. 379 (9834): 2352–2363. doi:10.1016/S0140-6736(12)60768-5. PMC 3386495. PMID 22632908.
- Wardlaw, Joanna M; Murray, Veronica; Berge, Eivind; del Zoppo, Gregory; Sandercock, Peter; Lindley, Richard L; Cohen, Geoff (June 2012). "Recombinant tissue plasminogen activator for acute ischaemic stroke: an updated systematic review and meta-analysis". The Lancet. 379 (9834): 2364–2372. doi:10.1016/S0140-6736(12)60738-7. PMC 3386494. PMID 22632907.
- Wardlaw, Joanna M; Smith, Colin; Dichgans, Martin (May 2013). "Mechanisms of sporadic cerebral small vessel disease: insights from neuroimaging". The Lancet Neurology. 12 (5): 483–497. doi:10.1016/S1474-4422(13)70060-7. PMC 3836247. PMID 23602162.
- Wardlaw, Joanna M; Smith, Eric E; Biessels, Geert J; Cordonnier, Charlotte; Fazekas, Franz; Frayne, Richard; Lindley, Richard I; O'Brien, John T; Barkhof, Frederik; Benavente, Oscar R; Black, Sandra E; Brayne, Carol; Breteler, Monique; Chabriat, Hugues; DeCarli, Charles; de Leeuw, Frank-Erik; Doubal, Fergus; Duering, Marco; Fox, Nick C; Greenberg, Steven; Hachinski, Vladimir; Kilimann, Ingo; Mok, Vincent; Oostenbrugge, Robert van; Pantoni, Leonardo; Speck, Oliver; Stephan, Blossom C M; Teipel, Stefan; Viswanathan, Anand; Werring, David; Chen, Christopher; Smith, Colin; van Buchem, Mark; Norrving, Bo; Gorelick, Philip B; Dichgans, Martin (August 2013). "Neuroimaging standards for research into small vessel disease and its contribution to ageing and neurodegeneration". The Lancet Neurology. 12 (8): 822–838. doi:10.1016/S1474-4422(13)70124-8. PMC 3714437. PMID 23867200.
- Gorelick, Philip B.; Testai, Fernando; Hankey, Graeme; Wardlaw, Joanna M., eds. (2014). Hankey's Clinical Neurology (2nd ed.). London: Manson Publishing. ISBN 978-1840761931.
- Emberson, Jonathan; Lees, Kennedy R; Lyden, Patrick; Blackwell, Lisa; Albers, Gregory; Bluhmki, Erich; Brott, Thomas; Cohen, Geoff; Davis, Stephen; Donnan, Geoffrey; Grotta, James; Howard, George; Kaste, Markku; Koga, Masatoshi; von Kummer, Ruediger; Lansberg, Maarten; Lindley, Richard I; Murray, Gordon; Olivot, Jean Marc; Parsons, Mark; Tilley, Barbara; Toni, Danilo; Toyoda, Kazunori; Wahlgren, Nils; Wardlaw, Joanna; Whiteley, William; del Zoppo, Gregory J; Baigent, Colin; Sandercock, Peter; Hacke, Werner (November 2014). "Effect of treatment delay, age, and stroke severity on the effects of intravenous thrombolysis with alteplase for acute ischaemic stroke: a meta-analysis of individual patient data from randomised trials". The Lancet. 384 (9958): 1929–1935. doi:10.1016/S0140-6736(14)60584-5. PMC 4441266. PMID 25106063.
