= Frank Farmer (physicist) =

Frank Farmer OBE (18 September 1912 – 16 July 2004) was an English physicist, and a pioneer in the application of physics to medicine, particularly in relation to the practical aspects of cancer treatment by radiation.

== Early life and education ==
Frank Taylor Farmer was born in Bexleyheath, Kent and studied at Eltham College before graduating with a first-class honours degree in electrical engineering from King's College London in 1933. He then continued to the University of Cambridge, where he completed a four-year PhD on radio-wave propagation in the ionosphere, working as part of J. A. Ratcliffe's research group. He continued researching this topic thereafter at the Marconi Research Centre near Chelmsford, Essex.

== Career ==
In 1940, Farmer began working as assistant physicist in the radiography department at Middlesex Hospital, one of a group of physicists employed by London hospitals during the war to work on issues related to the emerging technology of X-rays, and the use of radium to treat cancer. These issues would become the central focus of Farmer's subsequent career. One of the instruments he invented while at Middlesex, the Farmer dosimeter, became a standard tool used in hospitals around the world to calibrate X-ray machines, and is still produced commercially today.

In 1945 he moved to become head physicist at the Royal Victoria Infirmary (RVI) in Newcastle-Upon-Tyne. The hospital at that time had Marconi deep therapy X-Ray machines installed, with which Farmer was closely familiar from his time working at Marconi, and as a result the hospital was able to keep these machines in clinical use for many years. Farmer's team brought together experts in health physics, radio-isotopes, ultrasonics, instrumentation and physiological measurement. Specific innovations included the world's first gantry-mounted linear particle accelerator for cancer treatment, installed in 1963, and numerous clinical uses of the radioisotope tracer technique, developed using radio-isotopes from the nuclear reactors at Amersham and Harwell, which became available to researchers after World War II. When the new department opened, Farmer was appointed first Professor of Medical Physics at Newcastle University in 1966. While at the RVI, Farmer and his team turned the facility into a renowned centre for research into medical applications of radio-isotope technology, providing services in these areas to the entire region of Northern England, which had previously had none. At the time of Frank Farmer's retirement in 1978, the department had branches in Teesside and Cumbria, as well as the three hospitals in Newcastle, and employed 70 scientific and technical staff.

Farmer was President of the Hospital Physicists Association (1959–60; now the Institute of Physics and Engineering in Medicine) and the British Institute of Radiology (1973–74). During his career he served on the International Commission on Radiation Units and Measurements and many other professional radiography and research bodies, and authored a large number of scientific papers. He was awarded an OBE in 1973 for services to physics applied to medicine.

== Personal life ==
Farmer was a devout Quaker, and worked for and with numerous local projects in Newcastle-Upon-Tyne aiming to improve the lives of the homeless, especially in retirement. He was also a member of Friends of the Earth and environmental campaigner, living a frugal life with a solar panel installed on the roof of his house, and a public opponent of nuclear power and nuclear weapons.

He was also a keen amateur shortwave radio enthusiast. In 1977, the Wireless Institute of Australia awarded him the Cook Bicentenary Award for his dedication to the shortwave radio community.

In 1960, Frank Farmer married Dr. Marion Bethune, a paediatric cardiologist, who died before him. He died of pancreatic cancer in St. Oswald's Hospice in Newcastle in 2004, aged 91.
