= Clinical Oncology =

- Discipline: Oncology
- Language: English
- Edited by: Ananya Choudhury

Publication details
- History: 1989-present
- Publisher: Elsevier
- Frequency: 10/year
- Impact factor: 3.212 (2015)

Standard abbreviations
- ISO 4: Clin. Oncol.

Indexing
- CODEN: CLIOEH
- ISSN: 0936-6555 (print); 1433-2981 (web)
- LCCN: sn90031116
- OCLC no.: 21232301

Links
- Journal homepage; Online access; Online archive

Clinical Oncology is a peer-reviewed medical journal covering oncology. It was established in 1989 and is published monthly by Elsevier. It is the official journal of the Royal College of Radiologists. The editor-in-chief is Thankamma Ajithkumar. According to the Journal Citation Reports, the journal has a 2022 impact factor of 3.4.
