= Hisashi (architecture) =

Japanese architectural roof feature

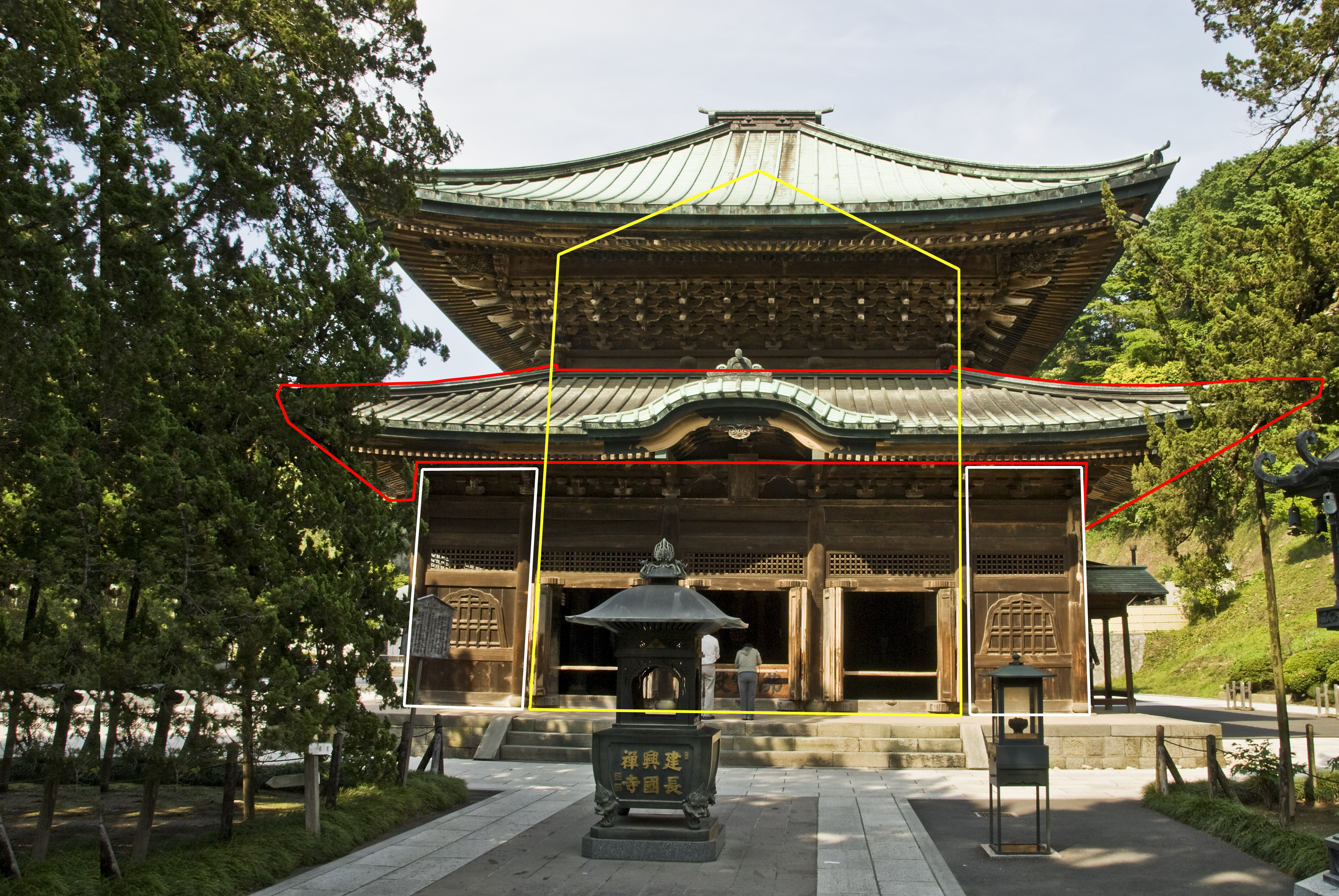
Yellow: moya; red: mokoshi, white: hisashi

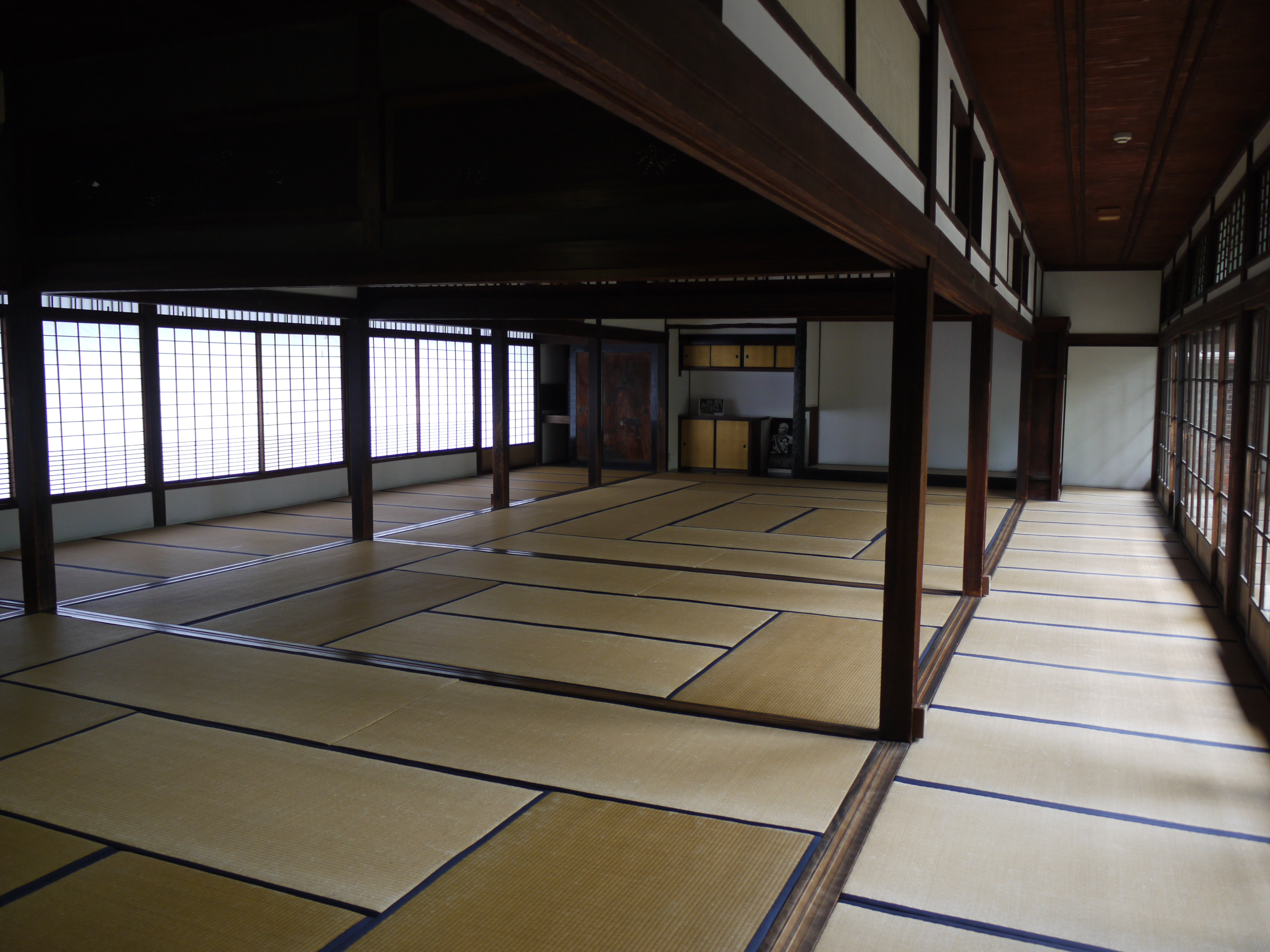
Hisashi partly-surrounding a moya. The space can be partitioned by shōji sliding in the grooves in the exposed floor beams (shikii) and lintels (kamoi). Residential.

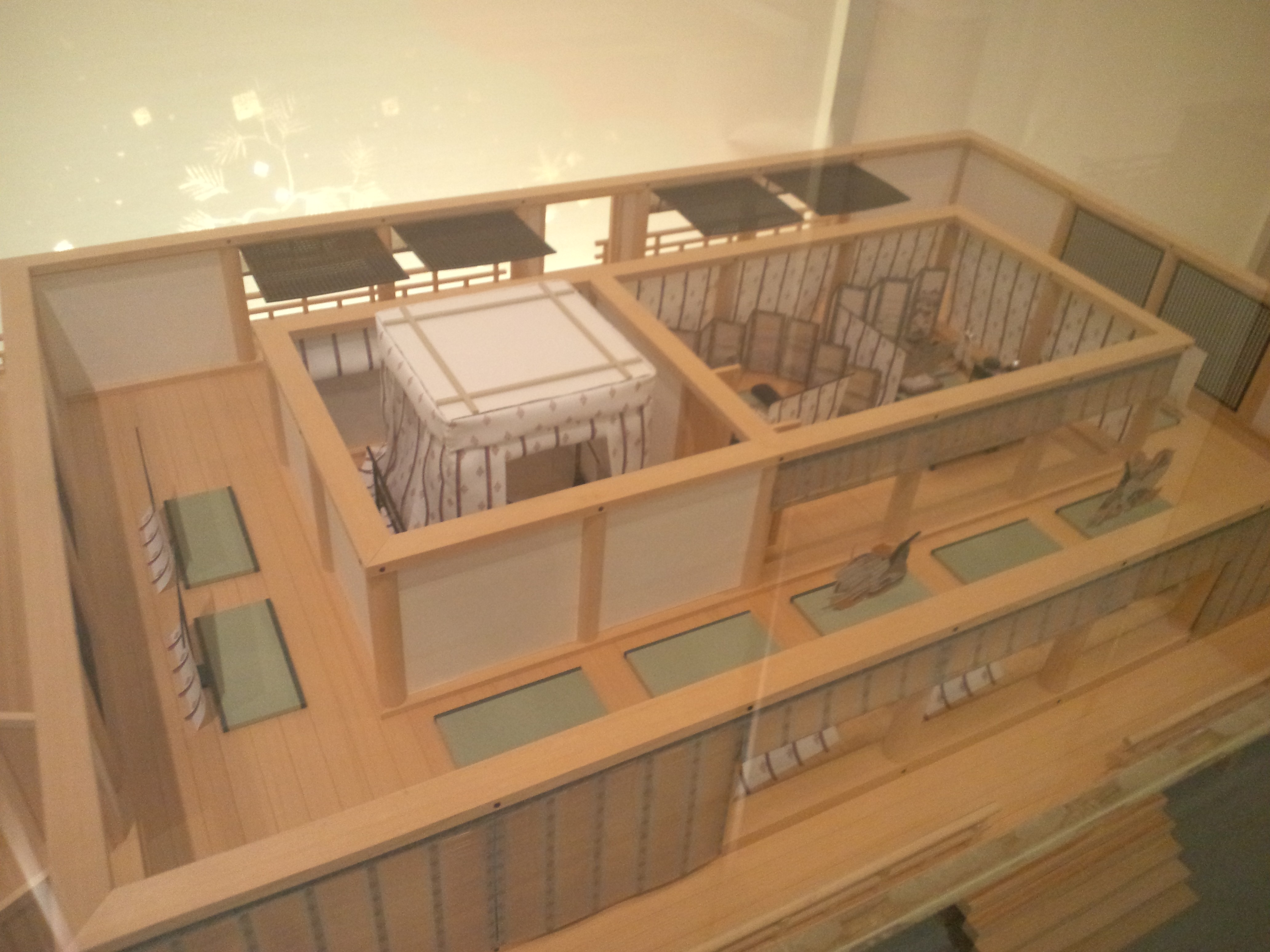
The surrounding corridor is the hisashi. Museum model.

In Japanese architecture the term hisashi (廂・庇) has two meanings:

1. As more commonly used, the term indicates the eaves of a roof, that is, the part along the edge of a roof projecting beyond the side of the building to provide protection against the weather.
2. The term is however also used in a more specialized sense to indicate the area surrounding the moya (the core of a building) either completely or on one, two, or three sides.

It is common in Zen Buddhist temples where it is a 1 ken wide aisle-like area and at the same level as the moya. Pagodas called tahōtō also have a hisashi.

Open corridors or verandas under extended or additional roofs are also sometimes referred to as hisashi. In temples constructed in the hip-and-gable style (irimoya-zukuri), the gabled part usually covers the moya while the hipped part covers the hisashi. The hisashi can be under the same roof as the moya, and be therefore invisible from the outside, or protrude and have a pent roof of its own as for example in the case of many Zen main halls (butsuden).

The main purpose of the hisashi is reinforcing the building's structure against side motion. Japanese traditional architecture was based on the post and lintel system, which is intrinsically not very strong. To strengthen it, therefore, an extra row of pillars and relative lintels are added, supporting the moya's walls. The hisashi can be present on just one or all four walls, and is counted with the suffix men (面, surface). A building can for example be said to be a 3 x 3 ken, 4 men butsuden if it is surrounded by a hisashi on all sides.

== A butsuden's floor plan ==
What follows the floor plan of a typical Zen main butsuden such as the one in the photo above at Enkaku-ji in Kamakura. The core of the building (moya) is 3 x 3 ken and is surrounded on four sides by a 1-ken wide hisashi, bringing the external dimensions of the edifice to a total of 5 x 5 ken. Because the hisashi is covered by a pent roof of its own, the butsuden seems to have two stories, but in fact has only one.

This decorative pent roof which does not correspond to an internal vertical division is called mokoshi (裳階・裳層; also pronounced shōkai), literally "skirt story" or "cuff story".

The same structure can be found in a tahōtō with the same effect: the structure seems to have a second story, but in fact it does not.

A butsuden's floor plan
