= Royal College of Radiologists =

Professional association of clinical oncologist and radiologist

Coordinates: 51.51615°N 0.11866°W

- Royal College of Radiologists logo

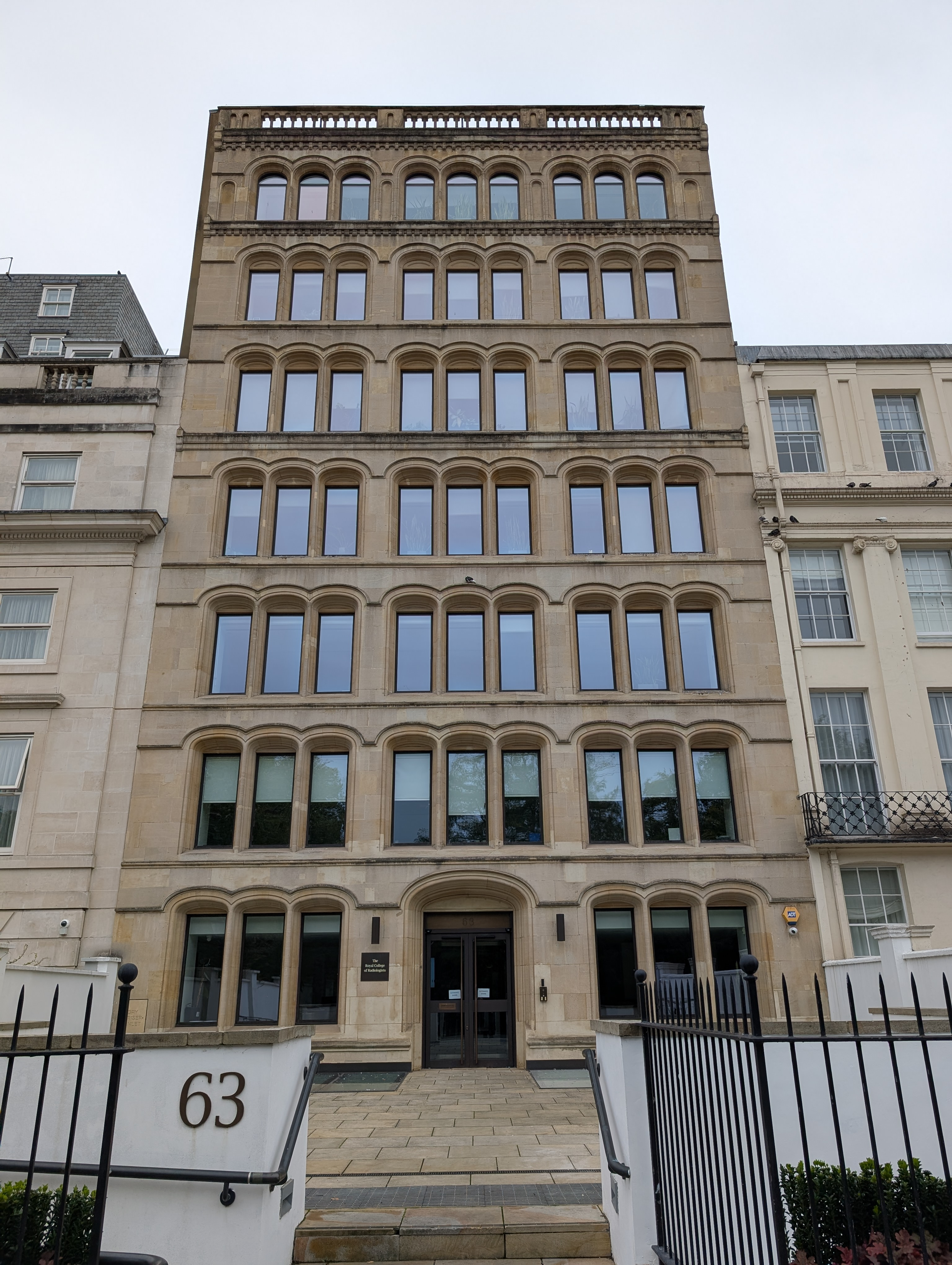
- Headquarters at 63 Lincoln's Inn Fields
- Formation: Association: 1934; 92 years ago Faculty: 1939; 87 years ago College: 1975; 51 years ago
- Type: Medical royal college
- Headquarters: Lincoln's Inn Fields, London, England
- Region served: United Kingdom
- Publication: Clinical Radiology; Clinical Oncology
- Affiliations: Academy of Medical Royal Colleges
- Website: www.rcr.ac.uk

The Royal College of Radiologists (RCR) is the professional body responsible for the specialties of clinical oncology and clinical radiology throughout the United Kingdom. Its role is to advance the science and practice of radiology and oncology, further public education, and set appropriate professional standards of practice. The college sets and monitors the educational curriculum for those training to enter the profession and administers the Fellowship of the Royal College of Radiologists exams. It is a registered charity in the United Kingdom (no. 211540).

The RCR has 2 faculties, representing Clinical Oncology and Clinical Radiology. It publishes two academic journals, Clinical Oncology and Clinical Radiology.

The RCR has been based at 63 Lincoln's Inn Fields in London since July 2013.

== History ==
A series of bodies has represented practitioners of radiological medicine in the UK, starting in 1897 with the foundation of the Roentgen Society (named for the physicist Wilhelm Conrad Röntgen). Subsequently, the British Association of Radiologists was founded in 1934. In 1935, The Society of Radiotherapists of Great Britain and Ireland was set up for doctors specializing in the treatment of cancers using X-rays and radium. The latter two bodies amalgamated in 1939 to form the Faculty of Radiologists, which was granted a Royal Charter in 1953. In 1975, a Supplemental Charter was granted, and the faculty became the Royal College of Radiologists.

In 1950, the first issue of the Clinical Radiology Journal was published by the Faculty of Radiologists. The first issue of Clinical Oncology was published in September 1989.

In May 2021, the RCR launched the first national radiotherapy consent forms to help standardize, and strengthen the informed consent process for adult cancer patients undergoing radiotherapy. Standardized consent forms with tailored information regarding radiotherapy for different tumor sites were released, and digital versions developed in collaboration with digital consent company Concentric Health. Welsh language versions of the consent forms were published in June 2022.

== Fellowship of Royal College of Radiologist Examinations ==
Candidates are examined against the Specialty Training Curriculum for Clinical Radiology. The specialty trainees are expected to complete their First FRCR examination before progressing to ST2. During their ST3 training year they are expected to pass the Final FRCR Part A examination and must complete this before progressing to ST4. During ST4, trainees are expected to pass the Final FRCR Part B examination.

=== First FRCR examination ===
The fellowship examinations start at the beginning of the Specialty Training Year 1 (ST1). The First FRCR examination expects candidates to have gained a knowledge of the physical principles that underpin diagnostic medical imaging and of the anatomy needed to perform and interpret radiological studies. The First FRCR examination comprises two modules: Physics and Anatomy. The anatomy modules is a 90-minute exam comprising 100 images, where each image has several annotations, each of which in turn has a single related question. The physics module is a 120-minute multiple choice question paper comprising 40 questions, each with five true or false answers.

=== Final FRCR Part A examination ===
The Final FRCR Part A examination comprises the single best of answers, split into two separate papers for the purposes of delivery. Each paper contains 120 questions and examining candidates on all aspects of clinical radiology and the basic sciences of physics, anatomy and techniques.

The main areas examined are:

1. Cardiothoracic and Vascular

2. Musculoskeletal and Trauma

3. Gastro-intestinal

4. Genito-urinary, Adrenal, Obstetrics & Gynecology and Breast

5. Pediatric

6. Central Nervous and Head & Neck

=== Final FRCR Part B examination ===
During the ST4 training, the specialty trainees are expected to complete the Final FRCR Part B. The Final FRCR (Part B) examination consists of a reporting session, a rapid reporting session and an oral examination.

The extensive examination provided by the RCR ensures the high quality and standard of radiology consultants. It has been deemed as one of the hardest examinations in the medical profession, along with the FRCA and FRCPath.

== List of Fellows ==
- Moya Cole
- Dr. K.A. Dinshaw
- Adrian Dixon
- Frank Ellis
- Brian Hayes
- Janet Husband
- Syed Junaid
- Pankaj Nagori
- M. Krishnan Nair
- James Ralston Kennedy Paterson
- Kakarla Subba Rao
- Robert Twycross
- Joanna Wardlaw
- Catharine West
- Norman Bleehen
- Aniket Rajan

== See also ==
- Society and College of Radiographers
