= Ketayun Ardeshir Dinshaw =

Indian physician

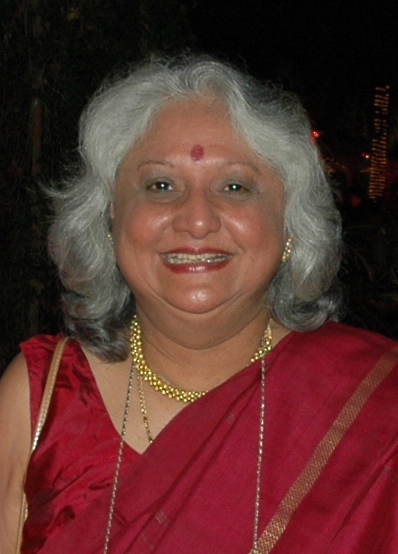
- Born: 16 November 1943; Calcutta, India
- Died: 26 August 2011 (aged 67); Mumbai, India
- Education: MBBS DMRT FRCR
- Medical career
- Profession: Radiation oncology
- Institutions: Tata Memorial Centre
- Research: Cancer epidemiology, radiation therapy
- Awards: Padma Shri

Ketayun Ardeshir Dinshaw FRCR (16 November 1943 – 26 August 2011) was a prominent personality in the field of Indian medicine and played a significant role in the evolution of modern cancer care in India, and the development of effective radiation therapy. In 2001, the President of India conferred on her the Padma Shri. A prominent news channel has described her as: “The ultimate hope and the last possible post to cling onto for the cancer-struck in India”. Over a thirty-year period, Dinshaw revolutionised cancer medicine in India, refining multi-modal treatments as the exception rather than the rule.

== Life and career ==
Born to a Parsi family in Calcutta.

Dinshaw started her medical career by graduating from the Christian Medical College, Vellore in 1966. She continued her training at Addenbrooke's Hospital in Cambridge, UK, from 1970 to 1973. During this period she completed her diploma in radiation therapy (DMRT), and was then enrolled as a Fellow of the Royal College of Radiologists (FRCR) in London.

Following this she returned to India and became a staff member at the Tata Memorial Hospital, Mumbai, in 1974, and seven years later was named head of the department of radiation oncology. In 1995, she was appointed director of the Tata Memorial Hospital, and two years later was selected to oversee the Tata Memorial Centre (Tata Memorial Hospital and Cancer Research Institute) as well. She served as Director of this institute until 2008, and played a pivotal role in shaping the institute to its present-day status as one of India's leading cancer centres.

She has received numerous awards and recognitions, and has served as a member on numerous prestigious committees and bodies, including the International Union Against Cancer, International Atomic Energy Agency, and the Government of India. She has hundreds of publications to her name, and is on the editorial board of numerous scientific journals. Throughout her tenure at Tata Memorial Centre, she has been a driving force in establishing the highest standards, organising and refurbishing all departments, providing modern instrumentation for diagnosis and treatment of cancer, and establishing modern management systems and computerisation in the hospital.

One of her earliest initiatives was fostering an integrated team approach to cancer treatment, encouraging radiologists and surgeons to review new patients in the Lymphoma Joint Clinic. Together, the doctors established clinical protocols, and now channel cancer patients into appropriate treatment programs according to set guidelines—in the context of ongoing clinical trials. A vibrant scientific review committee and hospital ethics committee were commissioned by her to guide all research programs in the Tata Memorial Hospital. She developed the first brachytherapy program in India at the Tata Memorial Hospital, and was the driving force towards developing modern radiation therapy techniques, such as 3DCRT, SRT, IMRT, and IGRT.

Dinshaw has also been the force behind the establishment of the Advanced Centre for Treatment Research and Education in Cancer (ACTREC) in Navi Mumbai, the new Tata Clinic and Faculty block at TMH, the IGRT Facility block at TMH. She also played a key role in the development of an indigenous radiotherapy machine called Bhabhatron. The machine has since been installed in twenty other cancer centres in India, and donated to several developing countries.

She died on 26 August 2011 of cancer.

== Honors and achievements ==
- Padma Shri, awarded by the President of India for her contribution to the field of Science and Engineering (26 January 2001)
- Past President, International Society for Radiation Oncology (Beijing, China 1997–2001)
- Past President, Association of Radiation Oncologists of India (1995–1996)
- Indo American Ulrich Henschke Memorial Award of Excellence, (Madras, December 1993)
- Award for Excellence in Professional Competence by Federation of the Parsi Zoroastrian Anjumans of India (June 1997)
- Life Time Achievement Award for service to the causes of cancer by the Breast Cancer Foundation of India (March 2000)
- FIE Foundation National Award for Outstanding Contribution to Medicine (1999)
