= Sydney Domville Rowland =

English physician and medical journal editor

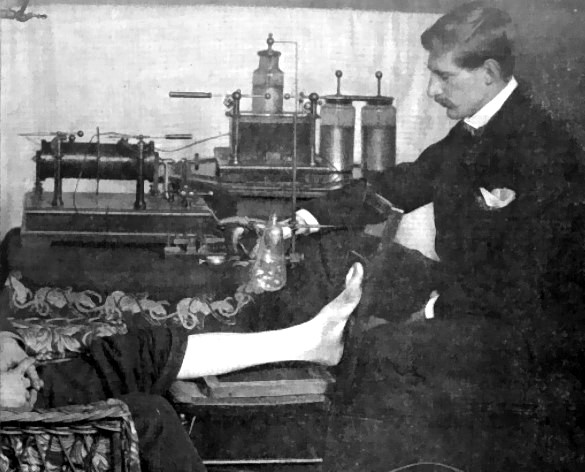
- Born: 29 March 1872; Cornwall, England
- Died: 6 March 1917 (aged 44); France
- Education: Berkhamsted School; Downing College, Cambridge; St Bartholomew's Hospital, London
- Known for: Coined term skiagraphy; Founder, British Journal of Radiology; Set up No. 1 Mobile Laboratory
- Medical career
- Profession: Physician
- Field: Radiology; Bacteriology
- Institutions: Lister Hospital

Sydney Domville Rowland (29 March 1872 – 6 March 1917) was an English physician and the world's first editor of a radiology journal. He coined the term "skiagraphy" and wrote some of the first works on X-rays in the Archives of Clinical Skiagraphy that preceded the British Journal of Radiology.

Rowland worked in India and helped confirm how plague is spread by rats carrying fleas, and later joined the Royal Army Medical Corps in the First World War as a bacteriologist in France, where he worked on septic wounds, typhoid carriers and gas gangrene, and set up No. 1 Mobile Laboratory, the first of its kind. He died at the age of 44 years after contracting meningitis during his work.

== Early life and education ==
Sydney Rowland was born in Cornwall, the United Kingdom, on 29 March 1872, the eldest son of the Reverend William J. Rowland and Margaret Domville. He had one sister, Agnes, and two brothers, William and Cecil. Ernest Hart, editor of the British Medical Journal (BMJ), was his uncle. In 1873, he moved to India with his family and lived in Jabalpur, Calcutta (now Kolkata), and Darjeeling. In 1880 he returned to England and attended Berkhamsted School, where he held a scholarship. He won a natural sciences scholarship to Downing College, Cambridge, where he was president of the Natural History Society, and from where he graduated in 1892 with a 1st Class in Natural Sciences Tripos Part I, and in 1893 with a 2nd Class in Part II. He passed his first and second M.B. at Cambridge and won the Shuter scholarship at St Bartholomew's Hospital, London, from where he graduated M.R.C.S., L.R.C.P. in 1897.

== Career ==
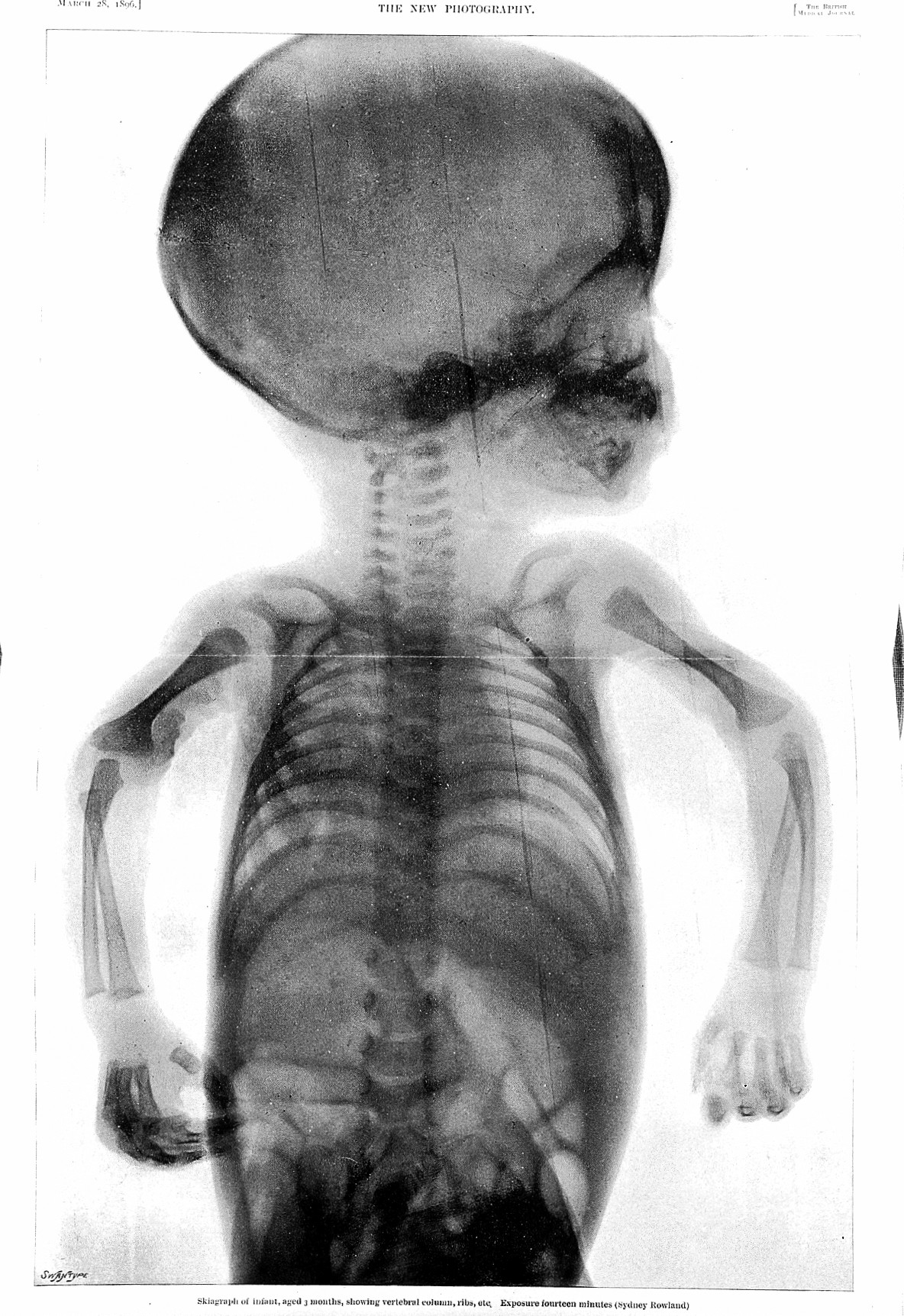
Skiagraph of three-month-old infant by Rowland, 1896

Rowland's career began in medical journalism while he was still a medical student when, in 1896, as Hart's intern, the year following the discovery of X-rays, the BMJ appointed Rowland as "Special Commissioner" to produce a report on the clinical use of X-rays titled "Report on the Application of the New Photography in Medicine and Surgery." (Note: Roentgen announced the discovery of X-rays on 8 November 1895, and a radiograph first appeared in England in the BMJ on 25 January 1896.) It was published in 17 parts between 8 February 1896 and 12 June 1897. In May 1896, he founded the world's first X-ray journal, the Archives of Clinical Skiagraph, a radiology journal that preceded the British Journal of Radiology. In the preface to the first issue, written in April 1896, he wrote that "the object of this publication is to put on record in permanent form some sort of the most striking applications of the new photography to the needs of medicine and surgery". He coined the term "skiagraphy" to describe the making of X-ray pictures and wrote some of the early works on radiology. Without any radiology experts or X-ray departments at the time, his journal became an essential reading.

He stopped studying X-rays in 1897 and moved into the field of laboratory medicine. The following year, he became an assistant bacteriologist at the Lister Hospital. In 1905, the Lister sent him to India to investigate and confirm the theory that plague is spread by rats carrying fleas. He returned to England in 1908 and 1909 and was sent to the Plague Commission again, but, this time to investigate plague prevention in the UK and later to find out how an outbreak of plague appeared in Freston village, East Suffolk.

Later, he joined the Royal Army Medical Corps in the First World War as a bacteriologist. In 1914, he bought a large motor caravan in England and set up No. 1 Mobile Laboratory, which he drove to the army area in France himself. The first of its kind, it formed the model for later mobile laboratories. During the war, he also worked on septic wounds, typhoid carriers, and gas gangrene. In 1915 he rose to the rank of Major and worked with the 26th General Hospital Royal Army Medical Corps.

== Death ==
Rowland died on 6 March 1917, at age 44, after contracting meningitis. He is buried at Étaples Military Cemetery.

== Selected publications ==
- Rowland, Sydney (29 February 1896). "Report on the Application of the New Photography to Medicine and Surgery". British Medical Journal. 1 (1835): 556–559. ISSN 0007-1447. PMC 2406392.
- Rowland, Sydney (3 October 1896). "The X Rays and their Application to Practice and Diagnosis". British Medical Journal. 2 (1866): 925–926. doi:10.1136/bmj.2.1866.925. ISSN 0007-1447. PMC 2510656. PMID 20756485.
- Rowland, Sydney (November 1910). "XXXVIII. First Report on Investigations into Plague Vaccines". Journal of Hygiene. 10 (3): 536–565. doi:10.1017/S0022172400043084. PMC 2167394. PMID 20474429.
- Rowland, Sydney (January 1914). "LXVI. The morphology of the plague bacillus". The Journal of Hygiene. 13 (Suppl): 418–422.13. ISSN 0022-1724. PMC 2167464. PMID 20474554.
