= Moya Cole =

Northern Irish doctor and oncological researcher

Mary Patricia "Moya" Cole (31 August 1918 – 16 May 2004) was a Northern Irish medical doctor, oncological researcher, consultant, and writer.

== Early life and education ==
Moya Cole was born in County Cavan. She attended primary schools in Carrickfergus and Portrush followed by Coleraine High School and then Methodist College Belfast. She earned a bachelor's degree in Physics from Queen's University, Belfast in 1939 and earned her master's degree one year later.

After teaching at Portadown College from 1941 and 1943 she returned to Queen's University and earned her MB in 1948. At Queens she was President of the Student Christian Movement and of the Students' Representative Council.

== Career ==
Cole worked at the Royal Victoria Hospital, Belfast and Maternity Hospital between 1949 and 1950. She obtained her DObst RCOG in 1950, after which she moved to Christie Hospital and Holt Radium Institute in Manchester, where she worked as a radiologist until she retired in 1983. She obtained a Diploma in Radiology Therapy in 1952 followed by an MD from Queen's the following year. She gained her FFR in 1954, later converted to FRCR - Fellow of the Royal College of Radiologists.

In 1971, Cole founded St Ann's Hospice in Heald Green where she served as the medical director. She became and chair of the management committee in 1983 and continued in that position until she left in 1991.

Cole also participated in medical research, publishing papers on terminal care and breast cancer. Cole published significant papers on the radiotherapy of carcinoma of the cervix and was co-author of the first clinical paper on tamoxifen.

== Death and legacy ==
After her retirement from St Ann's Hospice, a unit was named the Moya Cole Day Care Centre in her honor. Cole died in Newcastle, County Down on 16 May 2004, from complications of Parkinson's disease, aged 85.

== Awards and honours ==
She was awarded the Order of the British Empire in 1990.
