= Héctor Manuel Moya-Cessa =

Mexican physicist

- Born: 27 June 1966 (age 60); Acayucan, Veracruz, Mexico
- Education: Universidad Autónoma Metropolitana
- Scientific career
- Fields: Physics, Quantum Optics
- Workplaces: INAOE
- Doctoral advisor: Peter Knight

Héctor Manuel Moya-Cessa (born 27 June 1966) is a physicist specialising in quantum optics. He is currently a researcher/lecturer at Instituto Nacional de Astrofísica, Optica y Electrónica, in Tonantzintla, Puebla, Mexico.

== Career ==
Born in Acayucan, Veracruz, Mexico, Moya-Cessa performed work on his PhD with Peter Knight at Imperial College (1990–1993).

He served as President of the Division of Quantum Information of the Mexican Physical Society from 2011 to 2013.

== Research ==
He has published works on the generation of non-classical states of the quantized electromagnetic field and in trapped ions. He has also studied analogies between classical and quantum systems in waveguide arrays and with coworkers has experimentally shown how to perform the discrete Fourier transform (DFT) in these types of systems. Using this he and coworkers have shown that precisely the DFT of a number operator in an s-dimensional Hilbert space corresponds to the best definition of a phase operator in quantum optics: the Pegg and Barnett phase operator.

In Optics he has shown that the Bohm potential can be used to explain the Gouy phase. He has also shown that a GRIN medium, when studied beyond the paraxial approximation, generates an analogy with a quantum Kerr medium. By being able to generate non-classical states such as Schrödinger's cats (superposition of coherent states), the separation of a Gaussian beam can be generated in this way without the use of beam splitters.

== Books ==
- Soto-Eguibar, Francisco; Villegas-Martínez, Braulio Misael; Moya-Cessa, Héctor Manuel (2024). The Matrix Perturbation Method in Quantum Mechanics. Springer. ISBN 978-3-031-48545-9.
- Hernández-Sánchez, Leonardi; Ramos-Prieto, Irán; Soto-Eguibar, Francisco; Moya-Cessa, Héctor Manuel (2023). Formas de línea atómicas en modelos de tipo Jaynes-Cummings. Editorial Académica Española. ISBN 978-620-2-15886-2.
- Martínez-Carranza, Juan; Moya-Cessa, Héctor Manuel; Soto-Eguibar, Francisco (2012). La teoría de perturbaciones en la mecánica cuántica [The theory of perturbations in quantum mechanics] (in Spanish). ISBN 978-3-8473-6599-0.
- Manuel, Hector; Moya-cessa, Hector Manuel; Soto, Eguibar; Soto-eguibar, Francisco (2011). Introduction to Quantum Optics. Rinton. ISBN 978-1-58949-061-1.
- Moya-Cessa, Héctor Manuel; Soto-Eguibar, Francisco (2011). Differential Equations: An Operational Approach. Rinton. ISBN 978-1-58949-060-4.

== Awards ==
He is a Fellow of the Alexander von Humboldt Foundation and the Mexican Academy of Sciences. He has been awarded the ICO-ICTP Prize and a Science Research Prize of the Mexican Academy of Sciences for those under 40, both in 2006. In 2021, he was awarded the Marcos Moshinsky Medal by UNAM's Instituto de Física.
