= Ken (unit) =

Traditional Japanese unit of length

- Unit system: Japanese units
- Unit of: length
- Symbol: 間

Conversions
1 間 in ...	... is equal to ...
- Japanese units: 6 尺
- SI units: 1.818 m
- imperial/US units: 5.965 ft or 71.58 in

A Zen butsuden is 5 ken across.

The ken (Japanese: 間) is a traditional Japanese unit of length, equal to six shaku ('Japanese feet'). The exact value has varied over time and location but has generally been a little shorter than 2 meters (6 ft 7 in). It is now standardized as 1.82 m.

Although mostly supplanted by the metric system, this unit is a common measurement in Japanese architecture, where it is used as a proportion for the intervals between the pillars of traditional-style buildings. In this context, it is commonly translated as "bay". The length also appears in other contexts, such as the standard length of the bō staff in Japanese martial arts and the standard dimensions of the tatami mats. As these are used to cover the floors of most Japanese houses, floor surfaces are still commonly measured not in square meters but in "tatami" which are equivalent to half of a square ken.

== Word ==
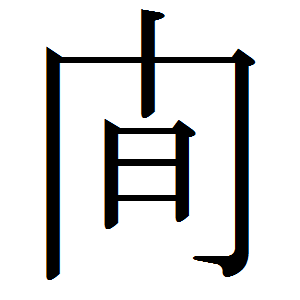
Japanese ryakuji "abbreviated character" for 間

Among English loanwords of Japanese origin, both ken and ma are derived from readings of the same character 間.

This kanji graphically combines 門 "door" and 日 "sun". The earlier variant character 閒 was written with 月 "moon" rather than "sun", depicting "A 門 door through the crevice of which the 月 moonshine peeps in".

The diverse Japanese pronunciations of 間 include on'yomi Sino-Chinese readings (from jian 間 or 间 "room; between; gap; interval") of kan "interval; space; between; among; discord; favorable opportunity" or ken "six feet"; and kun'yomi native Japanese readings of ai "interval; between; medium; crossbred", aida or awai "space; interval; gap; between; among; midway; on the way; distance; time; period; relationship", or ma "space; room; interval; pause; rest (in music); time; a while; leisure; luck; timing; harmony".

== History ==
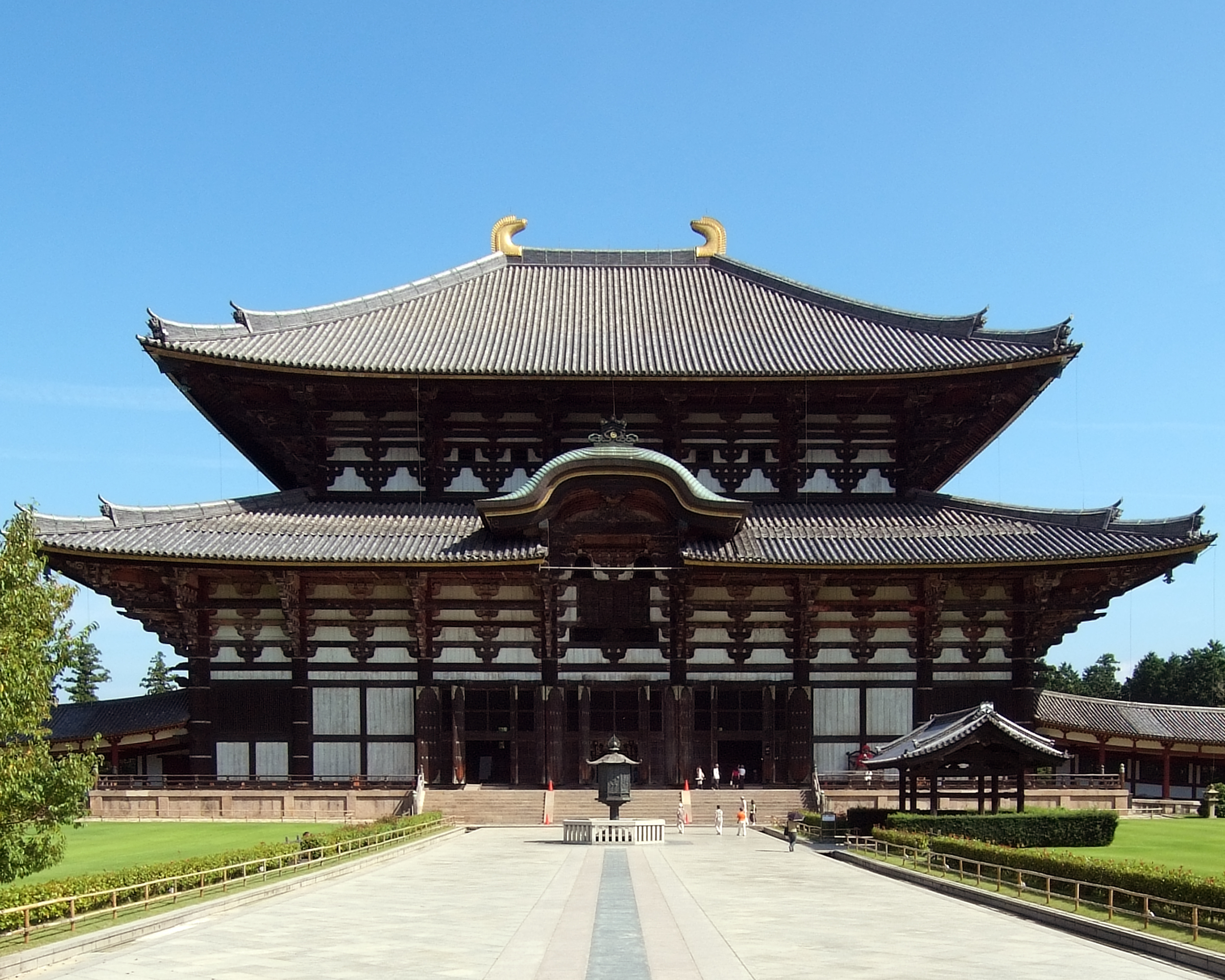
Tōdai-ji's Kon-dō's facade is 7 ken across.

The ken is based on the Chinese jian. It uses the same Chinese character as the Korean kan.

A building's proportions were (and, to a certain extent, still are) measured in ken, as for example in the case of Enryaku-ji's Konponchū-dō (Main Hall), which measures 11×6 bays (37.60 m × 23.92 m), of which 11×4 are dedicated to the worshipers. Inside buildings, available space was often divided in squares measuring one ken across, and each square was then called a ma (間), the term written with the same Chinese character as ken. Traditional buildings usually measure an odd number of bays, for example 3×3 or 5×5. A type of temple's gate called rōmon can have dimensions going from 5×2 bays to the more common 3×2 bays down to even 1×1 bay. The Zen butsuden in the illustration measures 5×5 ken across externally because its 3×3 ken core (moya) is surrounded by a 1-ken aisle called hisashi.

The value of a ken could change from building to building, but was usually kept constant within the same structure. There can however be exceptions. Kasuga Taisha's tiny honden's dimensions, for example, are 1×1 in ken, but 1.9×2.6 in meters. In the case of Izumo Taisha's honden, a ken is 6.32 m (20.7 ft), well above its standard value.

The distance between pillars was standardized very early and started being used as a unit of measurement. Land area in particular was measured using the ken as a basis. The unit was born out of the necessity to measure land surface to calculate taxes. At the time of Toyotomi Hideyoshi (16th century), the ken was about 1.97 m (6.5 ft), but around 1650 the Tokugawa shogunate reduced it to 1.818 m (5.96 ft) specifically to increase taxes. After the Edo period, the ken started to be called kyōma (京間).
