= Moya (given name) =

Moya is a feminine given name.

Notable people with the name include:

- Moya Bailey, African-American feminist scholar, writer, and activist
- Moya Beaver, Australian ballet dancer
- Moya Bowler (born 1940), English shoe designer
- Moya Brady (born 1962), British actress
- Moya Brennan (1952–2026), Irish folk singer, songwriter, and harpist
- Moya Cannon (born 1956), Irish author
- Moya Cole (1918–2004), Northern Irish medical doctor and oncological researcher
- Moya Dodd (born 1965), Australian soccer official, lawyer and soccer player
- Moya Doherty (born 1957), Irish entrepreneur
- Moya Dyring (1909–1967), Australian artist
- Moya Greene (born 1954), Canadian civil servant, President and CEO of Canada Post
- Moya Henderson (born 1941), Australian music composer
- Moya Lear (1915–2001), American businesswoman and wife of aviation pioneer Bill Lear
- Moya Llewelyn Davies (1881–1943), Irish Republican activist and Gaelic scholar
- Moya Nugent (1901–1954), British actress and singer
- Moya O'Sullivan (1926–2018), Australian actress
