= Lucas Moya =

Argentine footballer

Personal information
- Full name: Lucas Cristián Moya
- Date of birth: February 1, 1987 (age 39)
- Place of birth: San Fernando del Valle, Argentina
- Height: 1.81 m (5 ft 11 in)
- Position: Left winger

Team information
- Current team: Central Córdoba

Youth career
- Rosario Central

Senior career*
Years	Team	Apps	(Gls)
2005–2011	Rosario Central	20	(0)
2007–2008	→ Deportivo Coreano (loan)		
2011–2012	Aragua FC	27	(2)
2012–2014	San Lorenzo de Alem		
2014–2015	Santamarina		
2015–	Central Córdoba		
- * Club domestic league appearances and goals as of 6 May 2015

Lucas Cristián Moya (born 1 February 1987) is an Argentine football midfielder who plays for Central Córdoba.

== Career ==
Moya made his professional debut for Rosario Central on 26 August 2005 in a 4–0 home win against Lanús. He played two further games as an 18-year-old during 2005. He then played in the reserves until Apertura 2009 where he established himself as a regular player in the first team.
