= The British Journal of Radiology =

- Discipline: Radiology
- Language: English
- Edited by: Simon Jackson, Andrew Nisbet

Publication details
- Former names: Archives of Clinical Skiagraphy; Archives of the Roentgen Ray
- History: 1896-present
- Publisher: British Institute of Radiology
- Frequency: Monthly
- Open access: Hybrid
- Impact factor: 3.629 (2021)

Standard abbreviations
- ISO 4: Br. J. Radiol.

Indexing
- CODEN: BJRAAP
- ISSN: 0007-1285 (print); 1748-880X (web)
- LCCN: 49040049
- OCLC no.: 655274246

Links
- Journal homepage; Online access; Online archive

The British Journal of Radiology is a monthly peer-reviewed medical journal covering radiology. It is published by the British Institute of Radiology and the editors-in-chief are Simon Jackson (University Hospitals Plymouth NHS Trust) and Andrew Nisbet (University College London). According to the Journal Citation Reports, the journal has a 2021 impact factor of 3.629.

== History ==
The journal's forerunner, the Archives of Clinical Skiagraphy was established by Sydney Domville Rowland in May 1896. In July 1897 it was renamed the Archives of the Roentgen Ray and reported that it would keep a "record [of] the proceedings of the recently formed Roentgen Society, and will consist of original communications, notes, and correspondence ... (and) offers itself, not merely as a journal of the new photography, but to some extent as the exponent of an important discovery". It was published quarterly and was the only journal which reported the transactions of the roentgen Society.

In 1904, John Hall-Edwards became editor and in 1924, after 24 volumes, the journal was renamed The British Journal of Radiology (Roentgen Society Section) The Journal of the Roentgen Society, after a period of being Archives of Radiology and Electrotherapy and The Journal of the British Association of Radiology and Physiotherapy.

In 1928 the British Institute of Radiology and the Roentgen Society combined to form The British Journal of Radiology. Later, supplements were added and the journal became online from 2001. Old editions have been digitised.

== Notable articles ==
The journal published important works on the development of CT scan and MRI imaging techniques. For example:

- G. N. Hounsfield, Computerized Transverse Axial Scanning (Tomography): Part 1. Description of System, Br. J. Radiol. 46, 1016 (1973).
- P. Mansfield and A. A. Maudsley, Medical Imaging by NMR, Br. J. Radiol. 50, 188 (1977).
