= Omoya =

Japanese architectural element

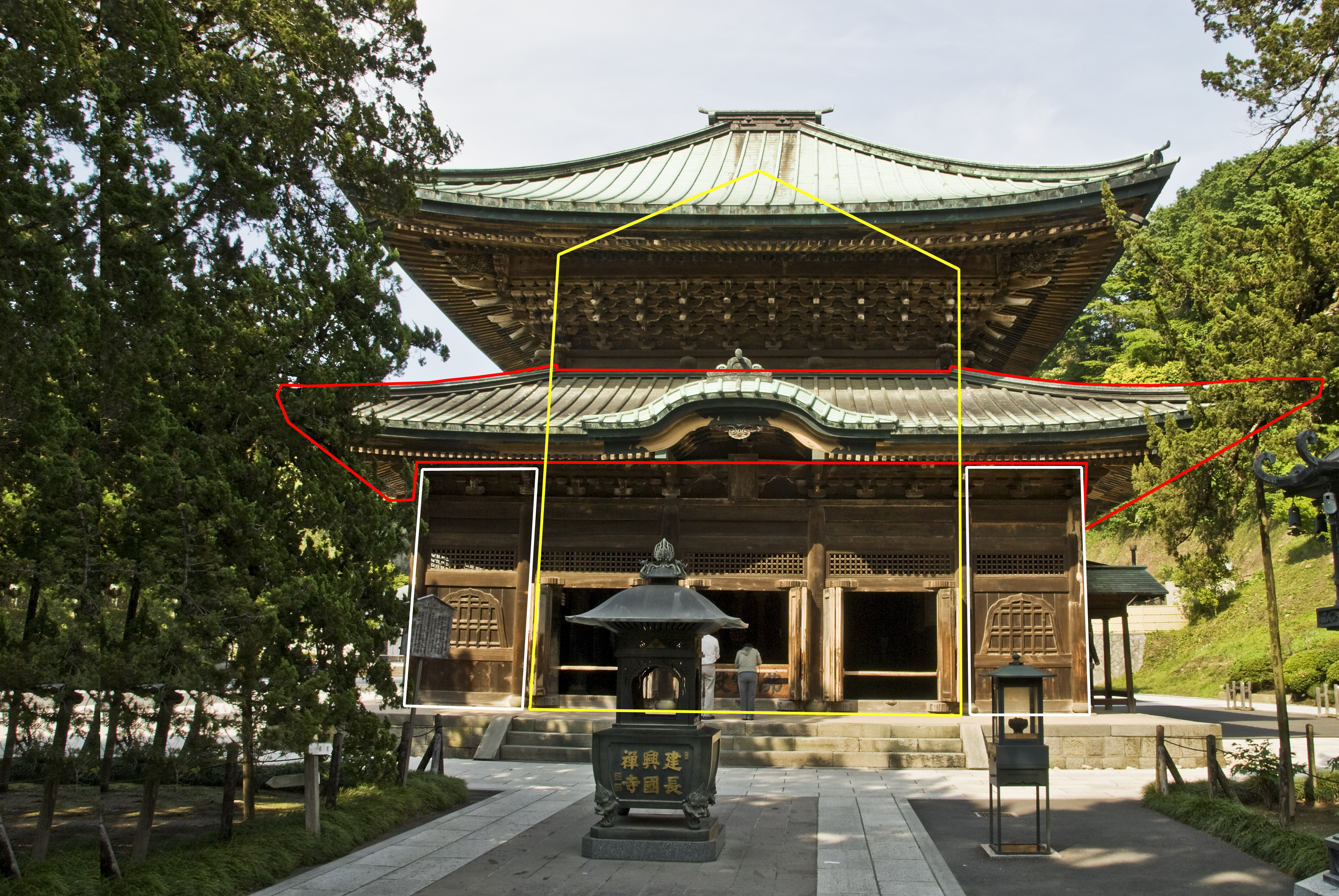
Yellow: moya, white: hisashi, red: mokoshi

In Japanese architecture, the omoya (母屋) is the core of a building. Originally, the central part of a residential building was called omoya. After the introduction of Buddhism to Japan in the 6th century, moya has been used to denote the sacred central area of a temple building. It is generally surrounded by aisle like areas called hisashi. In temples constructed in the hip-and-gable style (irimoya-zukuri), the gabled part usually covers the moya while the hipped part covers the aisles.

== A butsuden's floor plan ==
A butsuden's floor plan

The drawing shows the floor plan of a typical Zen main butsuden such as the one in the photo above at Enkaku-ji in Kamakura. The core of the building (moya) is 3 x 3 ken wide and is surrounded on four sides by a 1-ken wide hisashi, bringing the external dimensions of the edifice to a total of 5 x 5 ken. Because the hisashi is covered by a pent roof of its own, the butsuden seems to have two stories, but in fact has only one.

This decorative pent roof which does not correspond to an internal vertical division is called mokoshi (裳階・裳層; also pronounced shōkai), literally "skirt story" or "cuff story".

The same structure can be found in a tahōtō with the same effect: the structure seems to have a second story, but in fact it doesn't.
