= British Institute of Radiology =

- Predecessor: The Röntgen Society; The X-ray Society; The British Association for the Advancement of Radiology and Physiotherapy
- Formation: April 2, 1897; 129 years ago
- Headquarters: London, EC1; United Kingdom
- Website: bir.org.uk

The British Institute of Radiology (BIR) is a radiology society and charity based in London, United Kingdom. It is the oldest institute of its kind in the world, forming on 2 April 1897.

== History ==
The society can be traced back to two separate institutes, "The X-Ray Society" in April, 1897, and "The Röntgen Society"; both were formed in the wake of the discovery of X-rays by Wilhelm Röntgen in 1895. The latter was founded by Dr John Macintyre in 1897. He had been the first person in Britain to use X-rays, using equipment created by William Thomson, Lord Kelvin at Glasgow Royal Infirmary on 5 February 1896.

The formalisation of the BIR occurred in 1927 upon the merger of the two societies. The BIR became a registered charity in 1963.

Among other publications, the BIR publishes several journals including the British Journal of Radiology (BJR), and Dentomaxillofacial Radiology (the official journal of the International Association of Dentomaxillofacial Radiology, IADMFR). The Archives of Clinical Skiagraphy, first published in 1896, ultimately became the BJR in 1928.

== Notable past presidents ==
- 1897-98 Silvanus P Thompson
- 1907-08 William Duddell
- 1922-23 Sir Humphry Rolleston
- 1923-24 Sir Oliver Lodge
- 1972-73 Robert Steiner
- 1973-74 Frank Farmer
- 2003-04 Janet Husband

== Arms ==
Coat of arms of British Institute of Radiology

Notes
Granted 19 April 2023 by the College of Arms.
Crest
A demi Stag Gules attired and holding between the legs a Rod of Aesculapius bendwise Or the serpent Azure.
Escutcheon
Per chevron Or and Azure in chief two Little Owls and base issuant in chief a sun in Splendour all counterchanged.
Supporters
Dexter a man representing Wilhelm Röntgen habited in a shirt Argent a suit of clothes and shoes Sable holding in his exterior hand a Crookes Tube proper Sinister a Woman representing Marie Skłodowska Curie habited in a dress Azure and shoes Sable and holding in her exterior hand a round-bottomed Glass Flask proper both on a Compartment of Grass Vert.
