= Tahōtō =

Form of Japanese pagoda

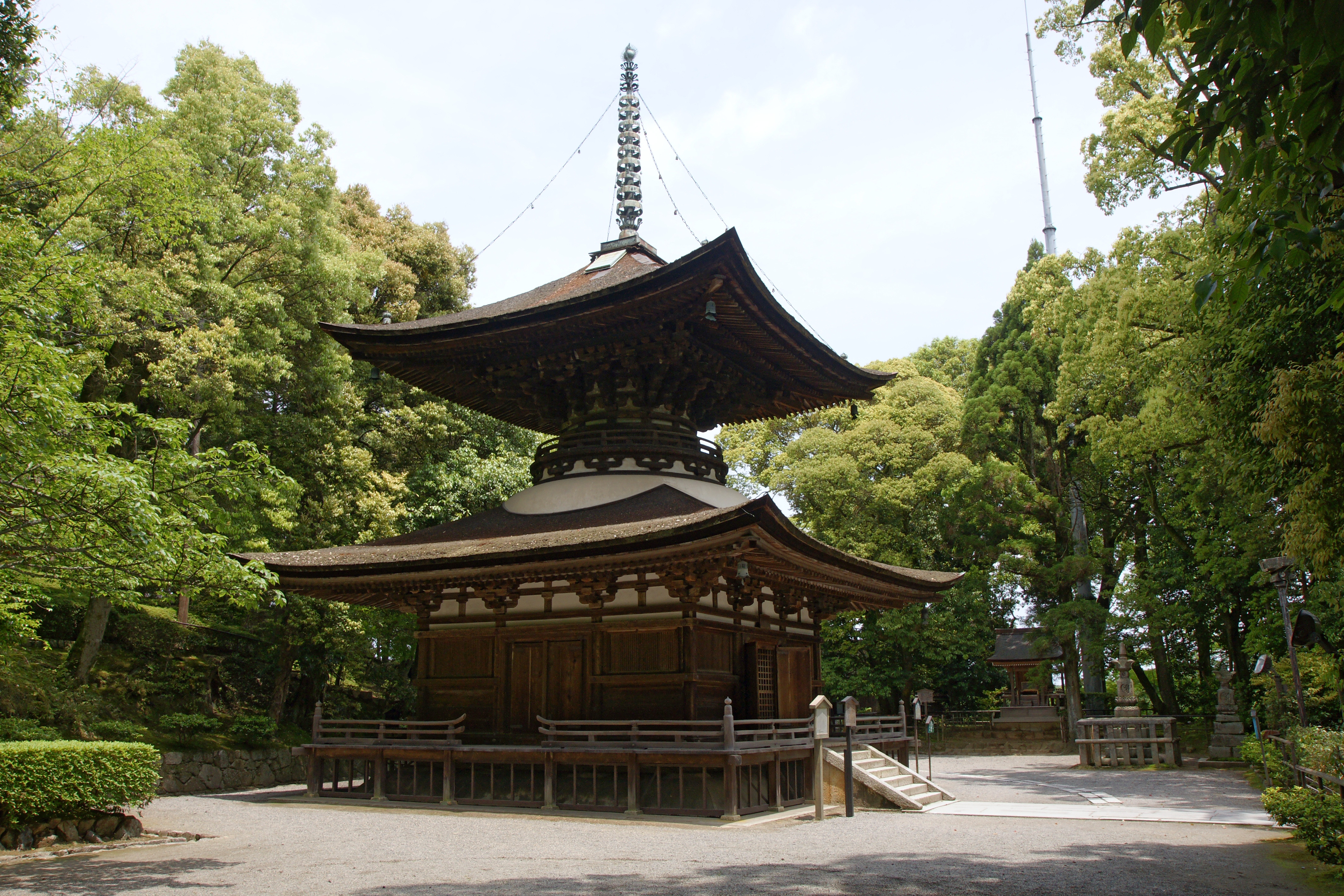
Tahōtō at Ishiyama-dera, dating to 1194 and a National Treasure; distinctive features are the square base; stupa mound; mokoshi or lower 'skirt' roof; upper pyramidal roof; and sōrin or finial

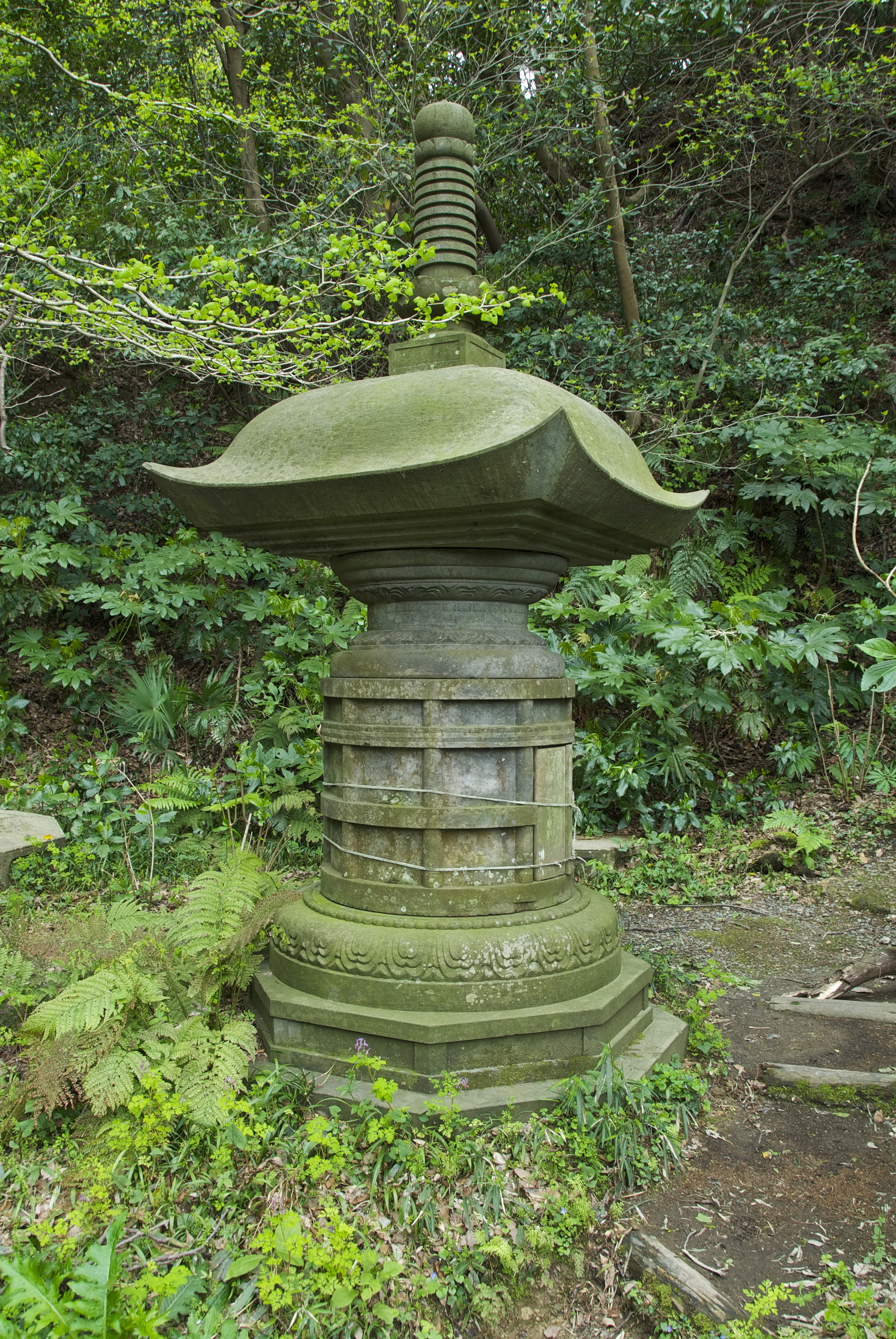
A hōtō

Floorplan of the daitō at Negoro-ji. Many features are shared with the tahōtō; the daitō is larger, with five bays on each side rather than three.

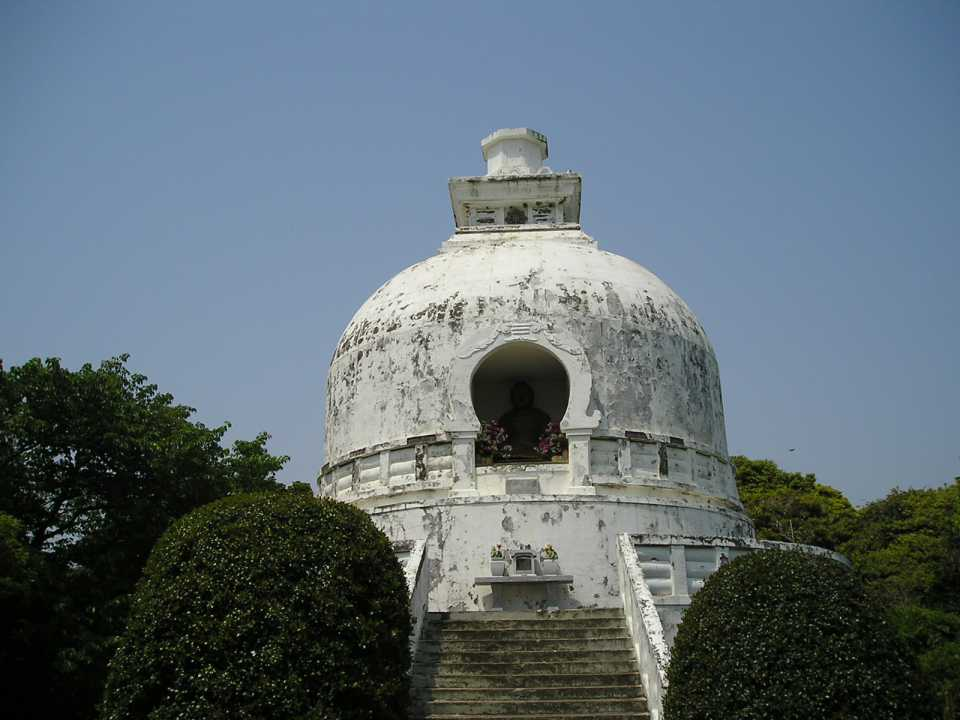
Stupa (仏舎利塔, busshari-tō) at Ryūkō-ji, Kanagawa Prefecture; without a protective roof, the plaster weathers rapidly.

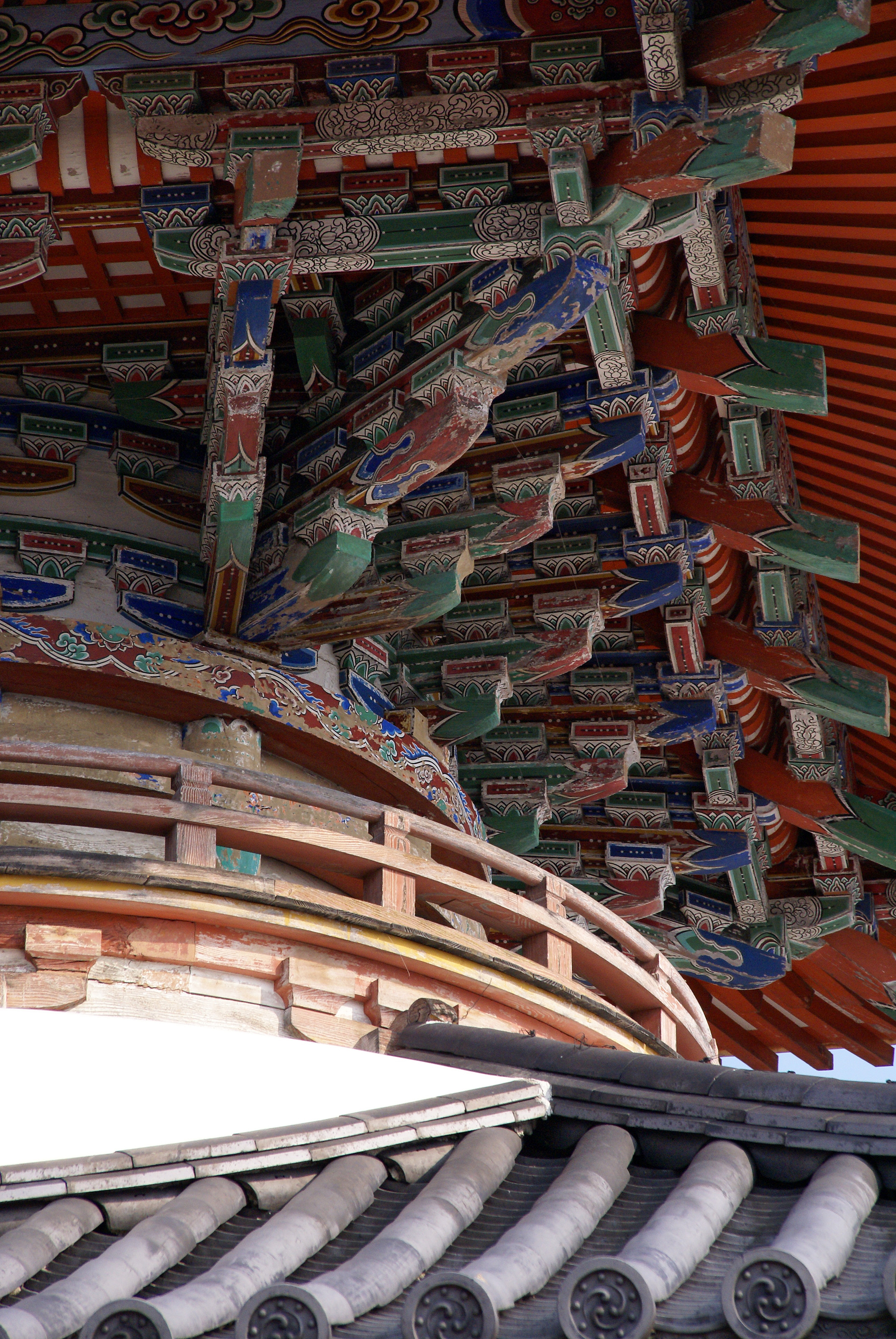
Four-stepped brackets at Sagami-ji, Hyōgo Prefecture

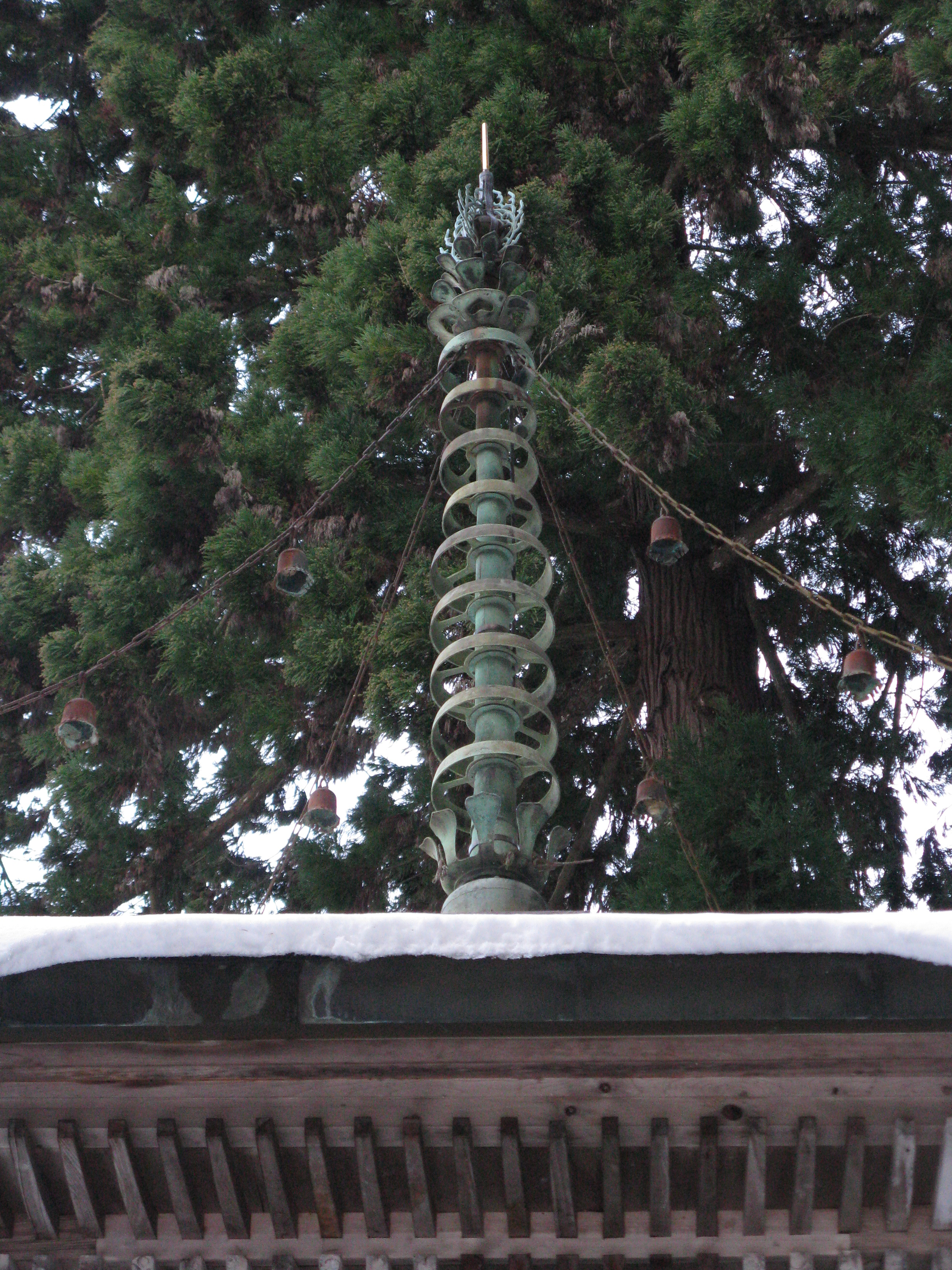
Bronze sōrin or finial at Iwawaki-dera, Ōsaka Prefecture; comprising an inverted bowl, lotus petals, nine rings, flame, and jewel

A tahōtō (多宝塔; lit. 'many-jewelled pagoda'; pronounced [tahoːtoː]) is a form of Japanese pagoda found primarily at Esoteric Shingon and Tendai school Buddhist temples. It is unique among pagodas because it has an even number of stories (two). (The second story has a balustrade and seems habitable, but is nonetheless inaccessible and offers no usable space.) Its name alludes to Tahō Nyorai, who appears seated in a many-jewelled pagoda in the eleventh chapter of the Lotus Sutra. With square lower and cylindrical upper parts, a mokoshi 'skirt roof', a pyramidal roof, and a finial, the tahōtō or the larger daitō was one of the seven halls of a Shingon temple. After the Heian period, the construction of pagodas in general declined, and new tahōtō became rare. Six examples, of which that at Ishiyama-dera (1194) is the earliest, have been designated National Treasures. There are no examples in China, whether architectural or pictorial, of anything that resembles the tahōtō, although there is a Song dynasty textual reference to a tahōtō with an encircling chamber.

== Hōtō ==
The hōtō (宝塔) or treasure pagoda is the ancestor of the tahōtō and dates to the introduction to Japan of Shingon and Tendai Buddhism in the ninth century. No wooden hōtō has survived, although modern copies do exist. They are usually made from stone, bronze, or iron, and specimens are always miniatures comprising a foundation stone, barrel-shaped body, pyramid roof, and a finial.

== Daitō ==
While the tahōtō is 3x3 ken (bays), a larger 5x5 ken version exists, known as daitō (大塔) or 'large pagoda'. This is the only type of tahōtō to retain the original structure with a row of pillars or a wall separating the corridor (hisashi) from the core of the structure, abolished in smaller pagodas. Daitō used to be common but, of all those ever built, only a few are still extant. One is at Wakayama prefecture's Negoro-ji, another at Kongōbu-ji, again in Wakayama, another at Kirihata-dera, Tokushima prefecture, another at Narita-san in Chiba. (See the respective list entries.) Kūkai himself, founder of the Shingon school, built the celebrated daitō for Kongōbu-ji on Kōyasan; almost fifty metres high, chronicles relate that 'the mightiness of its single storey outdoes that of multi-storeyed pagodas'. The specimen found at Negoro-ji (see photo above) is 30.85 meters tall and a National Treasure.

== Structure ==
=== Single-storey ===
Japanese pagodas have an odd number of stories. While the tahōto may appear to be twin-storied, complete with balustrade, the upper part is inaccessible with no usable space. The lower roof, known as a mokoshi, provides shelter and the appearance of an additional storey.

=== Floor plan ===
Raised over the kamebara or 'tortoise mound' (亀腹), the ground floor has a square plan, 3x3 ken across, with a circular core. Inside, a room is marked out by the shitenbashira or 'four pillars of heaven' (四天柱), a reference to the Four Heavenly Kings. The main objects of worship are often enshrined within.

=== Upper part ===
Above is a second 'tortoise mound', in a residual reference to the stupa. Since exposed plaster weathers rapidly, a natural solution was to provide it with a roof, the mokoshi. Above again is a short, cylindrical section and a pyramidal roof, supported on four-stepped brackets.

=== Finial ===
Like all Japanese pagodas, the tahōtō is topped by a vertical shaft known as the sōrin (相輪). This comprises the base or 'dew basin'; an inverted bowl with attached lotus petals; nine rings; 'water flame'; and jewel. The finial's division in sections has a symbolic meaning and its structure as a whole itself represents a pagoda.

== Miniature versions ==
A number of smaller versions of the tahōtō are known, of stone, bronze, iron, or wood, and similar to the hōtō.

== Meaning ==
A number of mandala show the Iron Stupa in southern India, where the patriarch Nāgārjuna received the Esoteric scriptures, as a single-storey pagoda with a cylindrical body, a pyramidal roof, and a spire. The forms used in the tahōtō, namely the square, circle, triangle, semi-circle, and circle, may represent the Five Elements or the Five Virtues. The egg-shaped stupa mound or aṇḍa may represent Mount Sumeru, with the finial as the axis of the world; or, by a folk interpretation, the square base may represents a folded robe, the dome an overturned begging bowl, and the spire a walking staff. The tahōtō served not as a reliquary tower but often as an icon hall.

== Examples ==
Image	Property	Date	Municipality	Prefecture	Comments	Designation
	Raigō-in tahōtō (来迎院多宝塔)	1556	Ryūgasaki	Ibaraki Prefecture	3 ken, shingle roof	ICP
	Rakuhō-ji tahōtō (楽法寺多宝塔)	1684	Sakuragawa	Ibaraki Prefecture	3 ken; originated in a three-storey pagoda of 1254, later ruined and rebuilt	Prefectural
	Banna-ji tahōtō (鑁阿寺多宝塔)	1692	Ashikaga	Tochigi Prefecture	3 ken	
	Kanasana Jinja tahōtō (金鑽神社多宝塔)	1534	Kamikawa	Saitama Prefecture	3 ken, shingle roof	ICP
	Kita-in tahōtō (喜多院多宝塔)	1639	Kawagoe	Saitama Prefecture	3 ken, tiled roof	Prefectural
	Nago-dera tahōtō (那古寺多宝塔)	1761	Tateyama	Chiba Prefecture	3 ken, copper roof	Prefectural
	Ishidō-ji tahōtō (石堂寺多宝塔)	1548	Minamibōsō	Chiba Prefecture	3 ken, shingle roof	ICP
	Narita-san daitō (新勝寺大塔)	1984	Narita	Chiba Prefecture	5 ken	
	Gokoku-ji tahōtō (護国寺多宝塔)	1938	Bunkyō	Tōkyō	3 ken, tiled roof; modelled on that of Ishiyama-dera	
	Ikegami Honmon-ji hōtō (池上本門寺宝塔)	1828	Ōta	Tōkyō		ICP
	Tsurugaoka Hachiman-gū daitō (鶴岡八幡宮大塔)		Kamakura	Kanagawa Prefecture	5 ken; destroyed	
	Nichiryūbu-ji tahōtō (日竜峯寺多宝塔)	1275-1332	Seki	Gifu Prefecture	3 ken, hinoki roof	ICP
	Kannon-ji tahōtō (観音寺多宝塔)	1536	Nagoya	Aichi Prefecture	3 ken, copper roof	ICP
	Shōkai-ji tahōtō (性海寺多宝塔)	1393-1466	Inazawa	Aichi Prefecture	3 ken, copper roof	ICP
	Mantoku-ji tahōtō (万徳寺多宝塔)	1467-1572	Inazawa	Aichi Prefecture	3 ken, hinoki roof	ICP
	Senjō-in tahōtō (泉浄院多宝塔)	1962	Inuyama	Aichi Prefecture	3 ken, tiled roof	
	Daiju-ji tahōtō (大樹寺多宝塔)	1535	Okazaki	Aichi Prefecture	3 ken, hinoki roof	ICP
	Chiryū Jinja tahōtō (知立神社多宝塔)	1509	Chiryū	Aichi Prefecture	3 ken, shingle roof	ICP
	Tōkannon-ji tahōtō (東観音寺多宝塔)	1528	Toyohashi	Aichi Prefecture	3 ken, shingle roof	ICP
	Mitsuzō-in tahōtō (密蔵院多宝塔)	1393-1466	Kasugai	Aichi Prefecture	3 ken, shingle roof; dismantled for repairs in 1953, roof repairs in 1977	ICP
	Ishiyama-dera tahōtō (石山寺多宝塔)	1194	Ōtsu	Shiga Prefecture	3 ken, hinoki roof; four painted pillars of the Kamakura period (ICP); inside are a Heian period and a Kamakura period wooden seated statue of Dainichi Nyorai, both (ICP)	National Treasure
	Kontai-ji tahōtō (金胎寺多宝塔)	1298	Wazuka	Kyōto Prefecture	3 ken, shingle roof	ICP
	Jōjakō-ji tōba (常寂光寺塔婆(多宝塔))	1620	Kyōto	Kyōto Prefecture	3 ken, hinoki roof	ICP
	Yoshimine-dera tahōtō (善峰寺多宝塔)	1621	Kyōto	Kyōto Prefecture	3 ken, hinoki roof	ICP
	Hōtō-ji tōba (寶塔寺塔婆(多宝塔))	1438	Kyōto	Kyōto Prefecture	3 ken, tiled roof	ICP
	Honpō-ji tahōtō (本法寺多宝塔)	1808	Kyōto	Kyōto Prefecture	3 ken, tiled roof	Prefectural
	Hōrin-ji tahōtō (法輪寺多宝塔)	1942	Kyōto	Kyōto Prefecture	3 ken, copper roof	
	Jingo-ji tahōtō (神護寺多宝塔)	1935	Kyōto	Kyōto Prefecture	3 ken, tiled roof; inside are five Heian period wooden seated statues of Kokuzō Bosatsu (National Treasures)	
	Chion-in tahōtō (知恩院多宝塔)	1958	Kyōto	Kyōto Prefecture	3 ken, tiled roof	
	Eikan-dō tahōtō (永観堂多宝塔)	1928	Kyōto	Kyōto Prefecture	3 ken	
	Daikaku-ji hōtō (大覚寺宝塔)	1967	Kyōto	Kyōto Prefecture	3 ken, tiled roof	
	Kurama-dera tahōtō (鞍馬寺多宝塔)	1960	Kyōto	Kyōto Prefecture	3 ken; the previous tahōtō was destroyed in the late Edo period	
	Sanmyō-in tahōtō (三明院多宝塔)	1961	Kyōto	Kyōto Prefecture	3 ken, copper roof	
	Seiryō-ji tahōtō (清凉寺多宝塔)	1702	Kyōto	Kyōto Prefecture	3 ken, tiled roof	Prefectural
	Anao-ji tahōtō (穴太寺多宝塔)	1804	Kameoka	Kyōto Prefecture	3 ken, tiled roof	Prefectural
	Daifukukō-ji tahōtō (大福光寺多宝塔)	1275-1332	Kyōtamba	Kyōto Prefecture	3 ken, hinoki roof; dismantled for repairs in 1918, roof repairs in 1955	ICP
	Enryū-ji tahōtō (円隆寺多宝塔)	1751	Maizuru	Kyōto Prefecture	3 ken, tiled roof	Prefectural
	Chion-ji tahōtō (智恩寺多宝塔)	1500	Miyazu	Kyōto Prefecture	3 ken, shingle roof	ICP
	Shōman-in tōba (勝鬘院塔婆)	1597	Ōsaka	Ōsaka Prefecture	3 ken, tiled roof	ICP
	Iwawaki-dera tahōtō (岩湧寺多宝塔)	1467-1572	Kawachinagano	Ōsaka Prefecture	3 ken, copper roof; inside is a Heian period seated wooden statue of Dainichi Nyorai (ICP)	ICP
	Kongō-ji tahōtō (金剛寺多宝塔)	1086-1184	Kawachinagano	Ōsaka Prefecture	3 ken, shingle roof	ICP
	Jigen-in tahōtō (慈眼院多宝塔)	1271	Izumisano	Ōsaka Prefecture	3 ken, hinoki roof	National Treasure
	Daiitoku-ji tahōtō (大威徳寺多宝塔)	1515	Kishiwada	Ōsaka Prefecture	3 ken, tiled roof	ICP
	Katsuō-ji tahōtō (勝尾寺多宝塔)	1987	Minō	Ōsaka Prefecture	3 ken, copper roof	
	Hōdō-ji tahōtō (法道寺多宝塔)	1368	Sakai	Ōsaka Prefecture	3 ken, tiled roof; dismantled for repairs in 1921, roof repairs in 1969	ICP
	Eifuku-ji tahōtō (叡福寺多宝塔)	1652	Taishi	Ōsaka Prefecture	3 ken, tiled roof	ICP
	Sagami-ji tahōtō (酒見寺多宝塔)	1662	Kasai	Hyōgo Prefecture	3 ken, tiled lower roof, hinoki upper roof	ICP
	Okusan-ji tahōtō (奥山寺多宝塔)	1709	Kasai	Hyōgo Prefecture	3 ken, tiled roof	Prefectural
	Chōkō-ji tahōtō (奥山寺多宝塔)	1710	Katō	Hyōgo Prefecture	3 ken, tiled roof	Prefectural
	Tokkō-in tahōtō (徳光院多宝塔)	1478	Kobe	Hyōgo Prefecture	3 ken, tiled roof	ICP
	Gaya-in tahōtō (伽耶院多宝塔)	1648	Miki	Hyōgo Prefecture	3 ken, tiled roof	ICP
	Renge-ji tahōtō (蓮花寺多宝塔)	1812	Miki	Hyōgo Prefecture	3 ken, hinoki roof	Prefectural
	Tōkō-ji tahōtō (蓮花寺多宝塔)	mid-Muromachi period	Miki	Hyōgo Prefecture	3 ken, iron upper roof, tiled lower roof	Prefectural
	Shōkon-ji tahōtō (荘厳寺多宝塔)	1715	Nishiwaki	Hyōgo Prefecture	3 ken, hinoki roof	Prefectural
	Chōon-ji tahōtō (長遠寺多宝塔)	1607	Amagasaki	Hyōgo Prefecture	3 ken, tiled roof	ICP
	Onsen-ji tahōtō (温泉寺多宝塔)	1767	Toyooka	Hyōgo Prefecture	3 ken, tiled roof	
	Kichiden-ji tahōtō (吉田寺多宝塔)	1463	Ikaruga	Nara Prefecture	3 ken, tiled roof	ICP
	Kume-dera tahōtō (久米寺多宝塔)	1615-1660	Kashihara	Nara Prefecture	3 ken, shingle roof	ICP
	Chōgosonshi-ji tahōtō (朝護孫子寺多宝塔)	late Edo period	Heguri	Nara Prefecture	3 ken, tiled roof	
	Hōzan-ji tahōtō (宝山寺多宝塔)	1957	Ikoma	Nara Prefecture	3 ken, tiled roof	
	Tōnan-in tahōtō (東南院多宝塔)	early Meiji period	Yoshino	Nara Prefecture	3 ken, shingle roof	
	Jison-in tahōtō (慈尊院多宝塔)	1624	Kudoyama	Wakayama Prefecture	3 ken, copper roof	Prefectural
	Kōyasan Danjō Garan daitō (大塔)	1937	Kōya	Wakayama Prefecture	5 ken; five Buddhas of the Diamond Realm enshrined inside, with bodhisattva painted on the columns, in a form of mandala; the first daitō was completed in 837; it and four successors were destroyed by fire	
	Kongōbu-ji Saitō (金剛峯寺西塔)	1834	Kōya	Wakayama Prefecture	5 ken, tiled roof; five Buddhas of the Womb Realm enshrined inside	
	Kongōbu-ji Tōtō (金剛峯寺東塔)	1984	Kōya	Wakayama Prefecture	3 ken	
	Kongō Sanmai-in tahōtō (金剛三昧院多宝塔)	1223	Kōya	Wakayama Prefecture	3 ken, hinoki roof; inside are Kamakura period wooden seated statues of the Five Buddhas	National Treasure
	Kimii-dera tahōtō (護国院多宝塔)	1449	Wakayama	Wakayama Prefecture	3 ken, tiled roof	ICP
	Kaizen-in tahōtō (海禅院多宝塔)	1653	Wakayama	Wakayama Prefecture	3 ken, tiled roof	
	Negoro-ji tahōtō (daitō) (根来寺多宝塔(大塔))	1492-1554	Iwade	Wakayama Prefecture	3 ken, hinoki roof	National Treasure
	Jōmyō-ji tahōtō (浄妙寺多宝塔)	1275-1332	Arida	Wakayama Prefecture	3 ken, tiled roof; dismantled for repairs in 1935	ICP
	Chōhō-ji tahōtō (長保寺多宝塔)	1357	Kainan	Wakayama Prefecture	3 ken, tiled roof; dismantled for repairs in 1927	National Treasure
	Henshō-ji tahōtō (遍照寺多宝塔)	1606	Kasaoka	Okayama Prefecture	3 ken, tiled roof	ICP
	Rendai-ji tahōtō (蓮台寺多宝塔)	1670	Kurashiki	Okayama Prefecture	3 ken, tiled roof; rebuilt after a storm in 1843	Prefectural
	Anjū-in tahōtō (安住院多宝塔)	1688-1703	Okayama	Okayama Prefecture	3 ken, tiled roof	Prefectural
	Shōen-ji tōba (tahōtō) (静円寺塔婆(多宝塔))	1690	Setouchi	Okayama Prefecture	3 ken, tiled roof	Prefectural
	Mitaki-dera tahōtō (三瀧寺多宝塔)	1526	Hiroshima	Hiroshima Prefecture	3 ken, tiled roof; originally part of a Hachiman shrine in Wakayama Prefecture; relocated in 1951 in honour of the victims of the atomic bomb	Prefectural
	Itsukushima Jinja tahōtō (厳島神社多宝塔)	1523	Hatsukaichi	Hiroshima Prefecture	3 ken, shingle roof	ICP
	Jōdo-ji tahōtō (浄土寺多宝塔)	1319-28	Onomichi	Hiroshima Prefecture	3 ken, tiled roof; dismantled for repairs in 1935, repainted in 1973	National Treasure
	Kōsan-ji tahōtō (耕三寺多宝塔)	1942	Onomichi	Hiroshima Prefecture	3 ken, copper roof; modelled on that of Ishiyama-dera	Registered
	Buttsu-ji tahōtō (佛通寺多宝塔)	1927	Mihara	Hiroshima Prefecture	3 ken, copper roof	Registered
	Akaibō tahōtō (閼伽井坊多宝塔)	1560	Kudamatsu	Yamaguchi Prefecture	3 ken, shingle roof; inscription with date found in 1928	ICP
	Kirihata-ji daitō (切幡寺大塔)	1618	Awa	Tokushima Prefecture	5 ken, twin-storey, tiled roof; pillars unusually arranged in a concentric square; relocated from Sumiyoshi Taisha in Ōsaka during the Meiji period	ICP
	Yakuō-ji yugitō (薬王寺瑜祇塔)	1963	Minami	Tokushima Prefecture		
	Kumadani-ji tahōtō (熊谷寺多宝塔)	1774	Awa	Tokushima Prefecture	3 ken, tiled roof	Prefectural
	Yoda-ji tahōtō (與田寺多宝塔)	1984	Higashikagawa	Kagawa Prefecture	3 ken, tiled roof	
	Ōkubo-ji tahōtō (大窪寺多宝塔)	1954	Sanuki	Kagawa Prefecture	3 ken	
	Dōryū-ji tahōtō (道隆寺多宝塔)	1980	Tadotsu	Kagawa Prefecture	3 ken, tiled roof	
	Yakuri-ji tahōtō (八栗寺多宝塔)	1984	Takamatsu	Kagawa Prefecture	3 ken	

== See also ==
- List of National Treasures of Japan (temples)
