= Sagami =

Sagami may refer to:

== Places ==
- Sagami Bay, a bay south of Kanagawa Prefecture in Honshū
- Sagami Line, a railway roughly along the east bank of the Sagami River
- Sagami Province, an old province in Japan
- Sagami Railway, a railway company operating three lines in Kanagawa Prefecture, Japan
  - Sagami Railway Main Line, a railway line extending from Yokohama to Ebina
  - Sagami Railway Izumino Line, a railway line extending from Futamatagawa in Yokohama to Shōnandai in Fujisawa
- Sagami River, a river in Kanagawa and Yamanashi
- Sagami-ji, a Buddhist temple in Hyōgo, Japan

== People ==
- Sagami (poet), an 11th-century waka poet
- Shin'ichi Sagami (佐上 信一; 1882–1943), Japanese Home Ministry bureaucrat
