= Oizuru (garment) =

Sacred garment of Japanese pilgrims

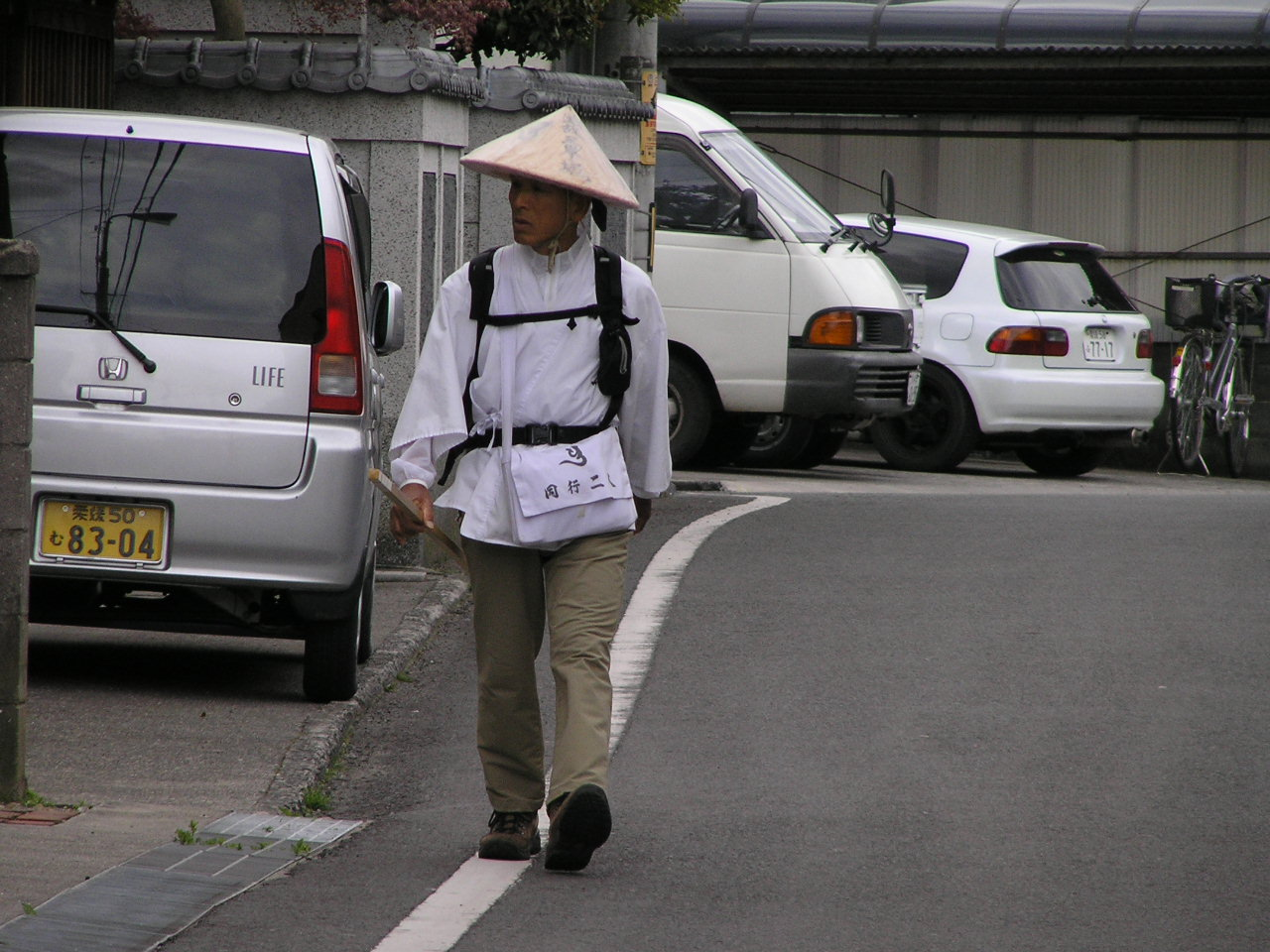
An aruki-henro or walking pilgrim, marked out by his distinctive sedge hat, white shirt (Oizuru), and kongō-zue. The henro-michi route passes through the countryside and a number of cities.

Oizuru is one of the sacred garments of the traditional dress of Japanese pilgrims.

== Relevance and use ==
Oizuru is the one of essentials of the Pilgrims. It is a simple outer garment. The shape of the garment is similar to a white coat or a jacket. There are three breadths of material are used in it that signify the Buddhist deities (Amida, Kwannon, and Seishi). The garment is stamped with a seal pilgrims visit. It is then preserved with utmost care. They clad the owner in the same at the time of burial.

== See also ==
- Shikoku Pilgrimage is a multi-site pilgrimage of 88 temples associated with the Buddhist monk Kūkai (Kōbō Daishi) on the island of Shikoku, Japan.
- List of National Treasures of Japan (sculptures)
- Buddhism in Japan
