= Kita-in =

Buddhist temple in Saitama Prefecture, Japan

Coordinates: 35°55′03.09″N 139°29′20.64″E

Kita-in 喜多院
- 星野山無量寿寺喜多院
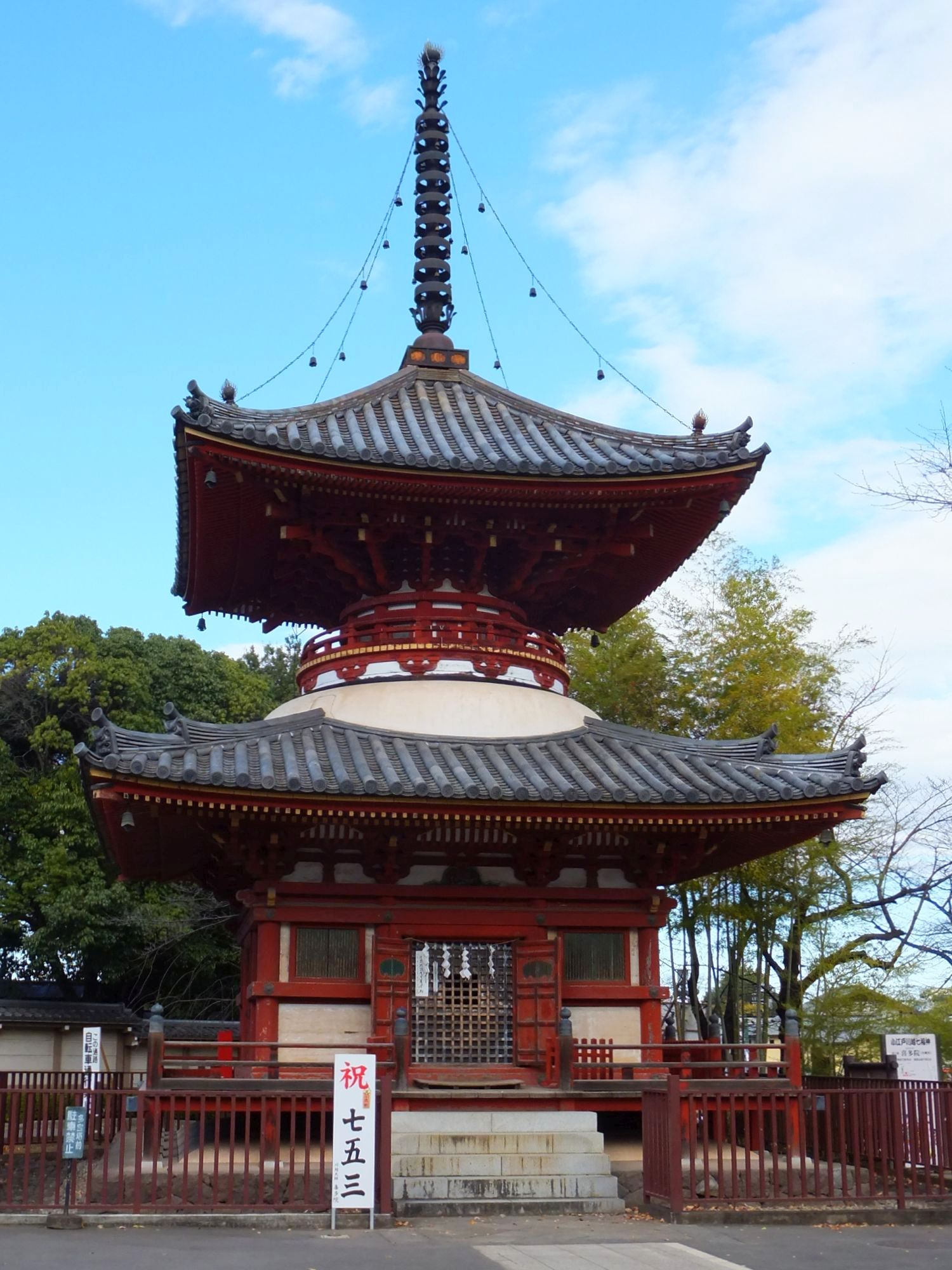
- Tahōtō

Religion
- Affiliation: Tendai
- Deity: Amida Nyorai

Location
- Location: 1-20-1 Kosenba-machi, Kawagoe, Saitama
- Country: Japan
- Interactive map of Kita-in 喜多院

Architecture
- Founder: Ennin
- Completed: 7th year of the Tenchō Era (830 AD)

Website
- Official website (in Japanese)

Seiya-san Muryōshuji Kita-in (星野山無量寿寺喜多院) is a Buddhist temple located in the city of Kawagoe in Saitama Prefecture, Japan. It is noted for its main hall, which was part of the original Edo Castle, and the statues of 540 Rakan, disciples of the Buddha. It is also known informally as the Kawagoe Daishi (川越大師).

== Origins and history ==
Kita-in is believed to have been founded in 830 AD by the monk Ennin under the orders of Emperor Junna, with the name Muryōju-ji (無量寿寺, temple of unending life), Muryōju being another name for Amitabha Buddha, the main object of worship. The Tendai temple was then divided in three parts called Kita-in (北院, northern temple), Naka-in (中院, middle temple) and Minami-in (南院, south temple). Naka-in is now a separate temple, and of Minami-in there remains only a cemetery.

Burned down during a war in 1202, it was rebuilt in 1296 under Emperor Fushimi and nominated a head temple of the Tendai sect in 1300 by Emperor Go-Fushimi, with control over 580 temples in eastern Japan.

It achieved its greatest fame and influence under the priest Tenkai and was patronized by the first three Tokugawa shōguns Ieyasu, Hidetada, and Iemitsu. Such was Tenkai's influence that when Kita-in burned in 1638, Iemitsu transferred part of Edo Castle to Kita-in. Because the castle burned during the Great Kantō earthquake of 1923, Kita-in contains the only extant structures from the original Edo Castle. These structures contain the reception rooms, study, kitchen, toilet and bathroom that Iemitsu used, as well as the actual room where Iemitsu is believed to be born in. Also contained is the dressing room used by his wet-nurse Kasuga no Tsubone who became mistress of the inner palace of Edo Castle. It was at that time that Kita-in replaced Naka-in as the most influential of the three temples. In the same period, the Chinese character in its name was replaced with the present ones, to mean great happiness. The temple was also patronized by the daimyō of Kawagoe Domain.

What is today Ueno's Kan'ei-ji main hall was taken from Kita-in and transferred to the site of a former Kan'ei-ji subtemple.

== Features ==
- Reception Hall – Constructed in the 15th year of the Kan'ei era (1638) as part of Edo Castle. The room itself is the birthplace of Tokugawa Iemitsu. The building is a National ICP.
- Wriitin Hall – Constructed in the 16th year of the Kan'ei era (1639) as part of Edo castle, it contains the private quarters of Lady Kasuga (National ICP).
- Priest's Quarters – Constructed in the 15th year of the Kan'ei era (1638). (National ICP)
- The sanmon was constructed in the 9th year of the Kan'ei era (1632). (National ICP)
- Shōrō – Constructed in the 15th year of the Genroku era (1702). (National ICP)
- Jigen-do - a chapel to the priest Tenkai, built in 1645 (National ICP)
- Senba Tōshō-gū enshrining the spirit of Tokugawa Ieyasu. Destroyed in the fire of 1638 which burned the rest of the temple, it was rebuilt in 1640 by order of Tokugawa Iemitsu with a structure closely resembling Nikkō Tōshō-gū. (National ICP)
- A tahōtō, a Japanese type of pagoda.
- Behind the main hall are the graves of five Matsudaira clan daimyōs who ruled Kawagoe Domain during the 18th and 19th centuries.
- Next to the entrance stand the statues of 540 disciples of Buddha known as the 500 rakan (五百羅漢, Go-hyaku rakan). Carved between 1782 and 1825, they portray the disciples in a great variety of positions, so that no two are alike.
Some of the 500 Rakan at Kitain

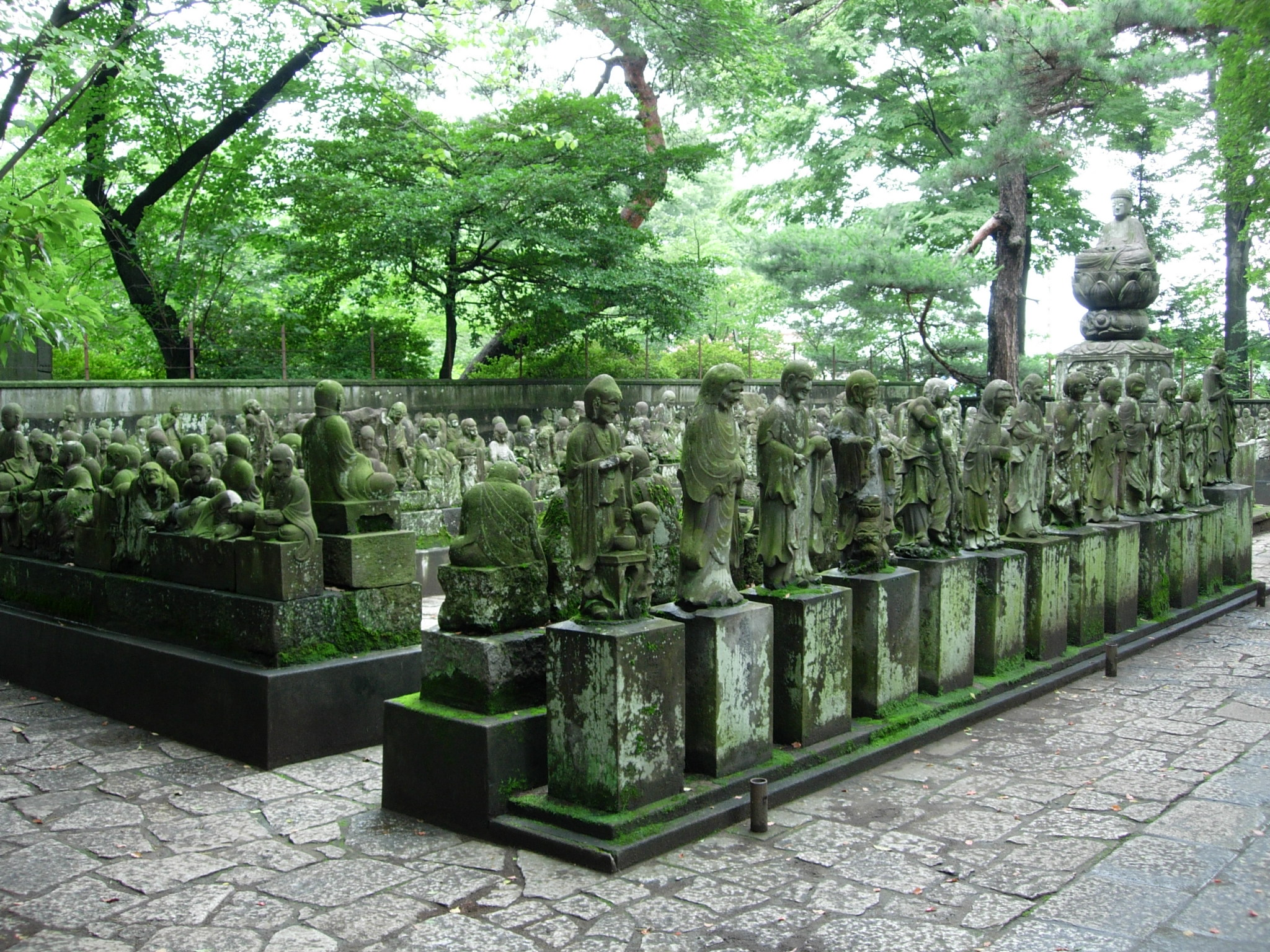

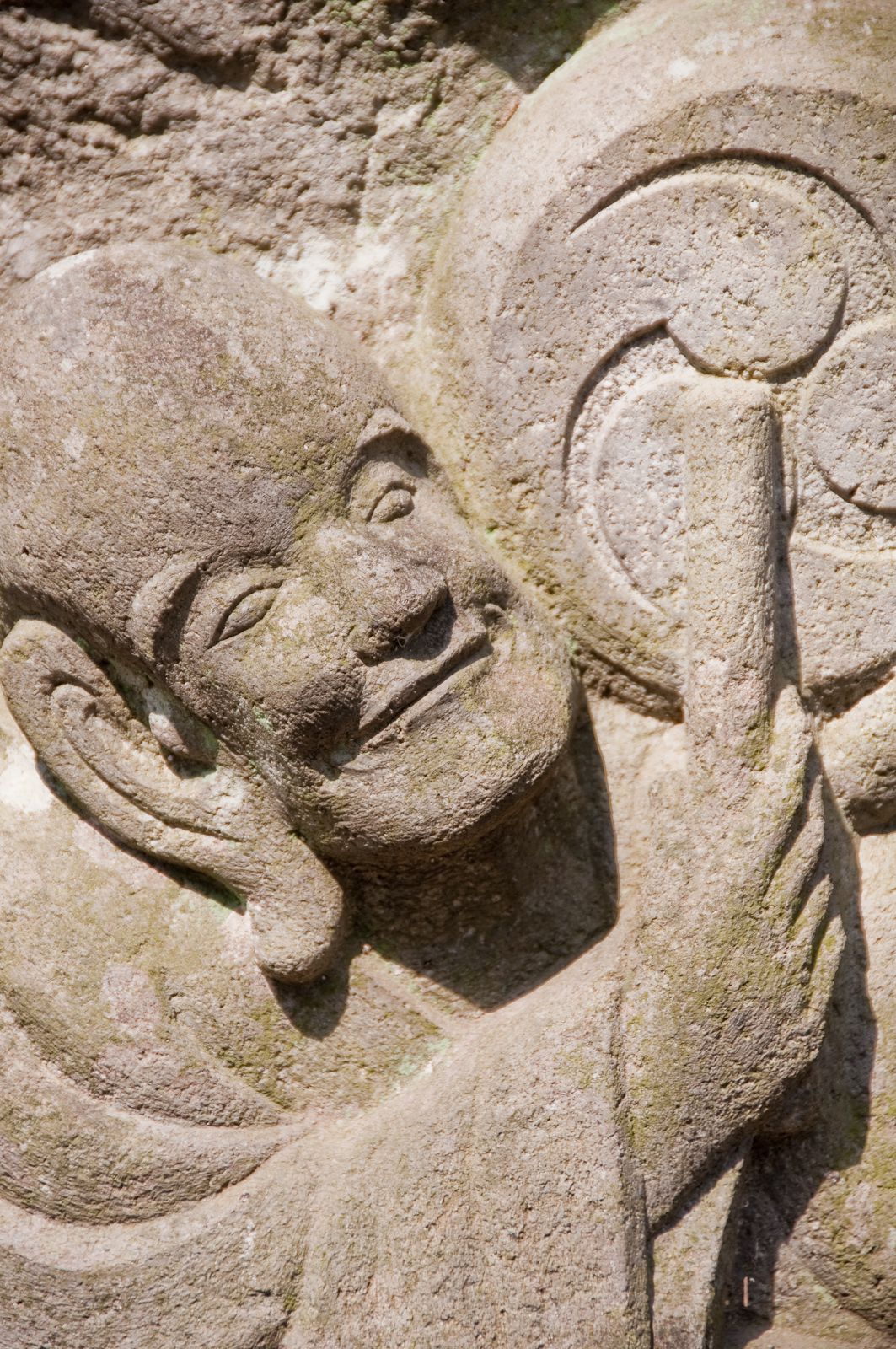

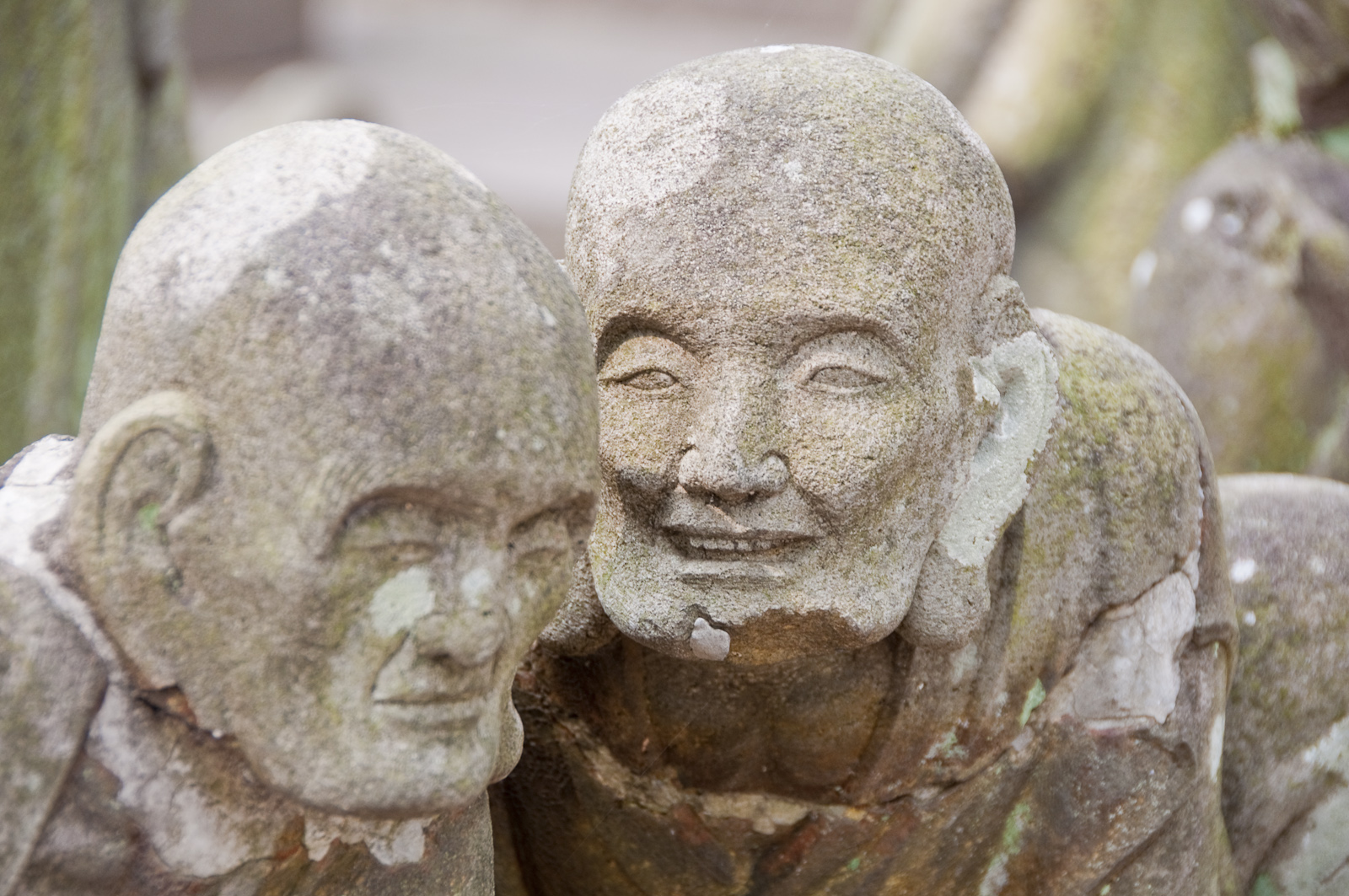

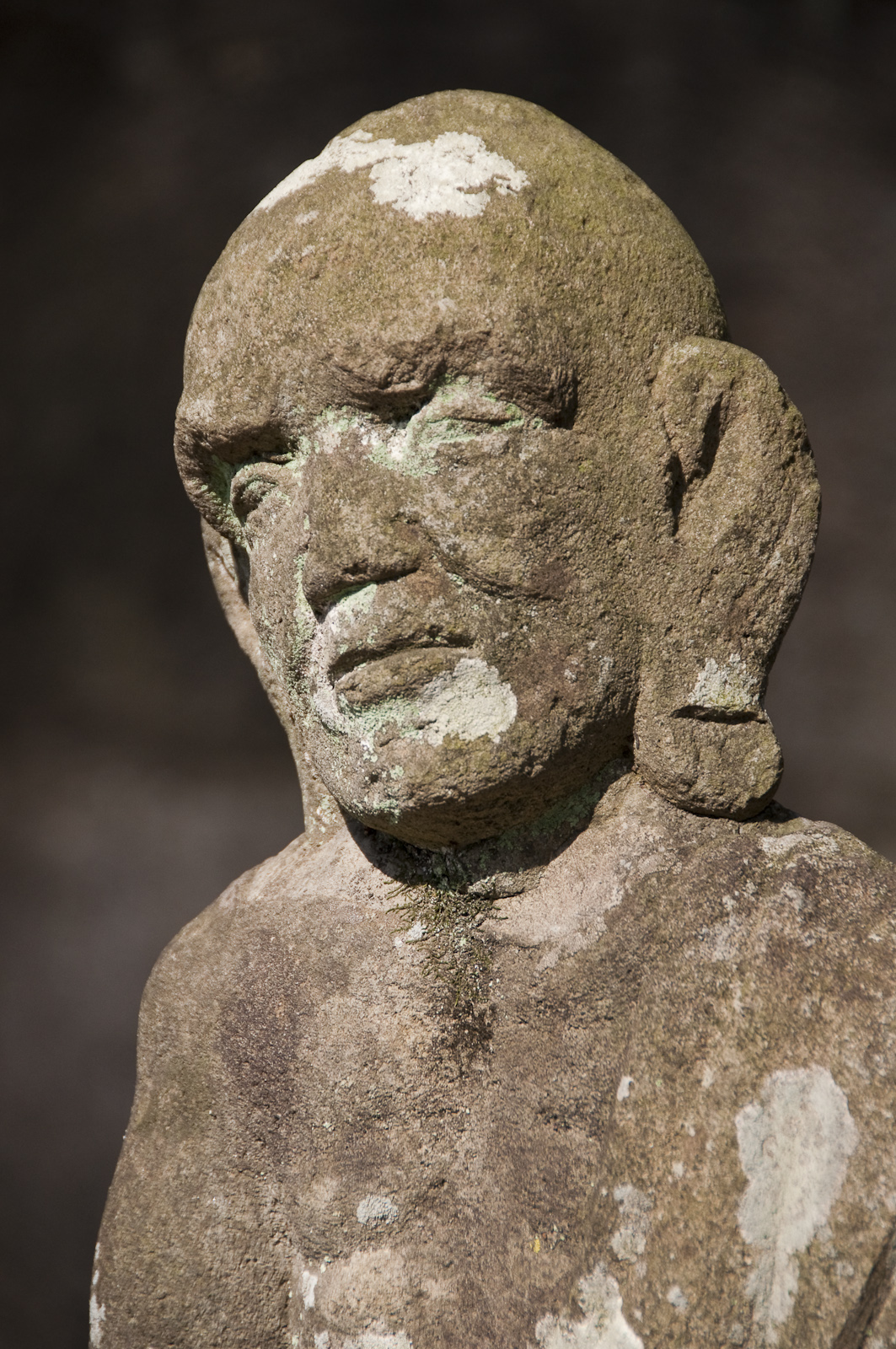
