= Tenkai =

Japanese Buddhist monk (1536–1643)

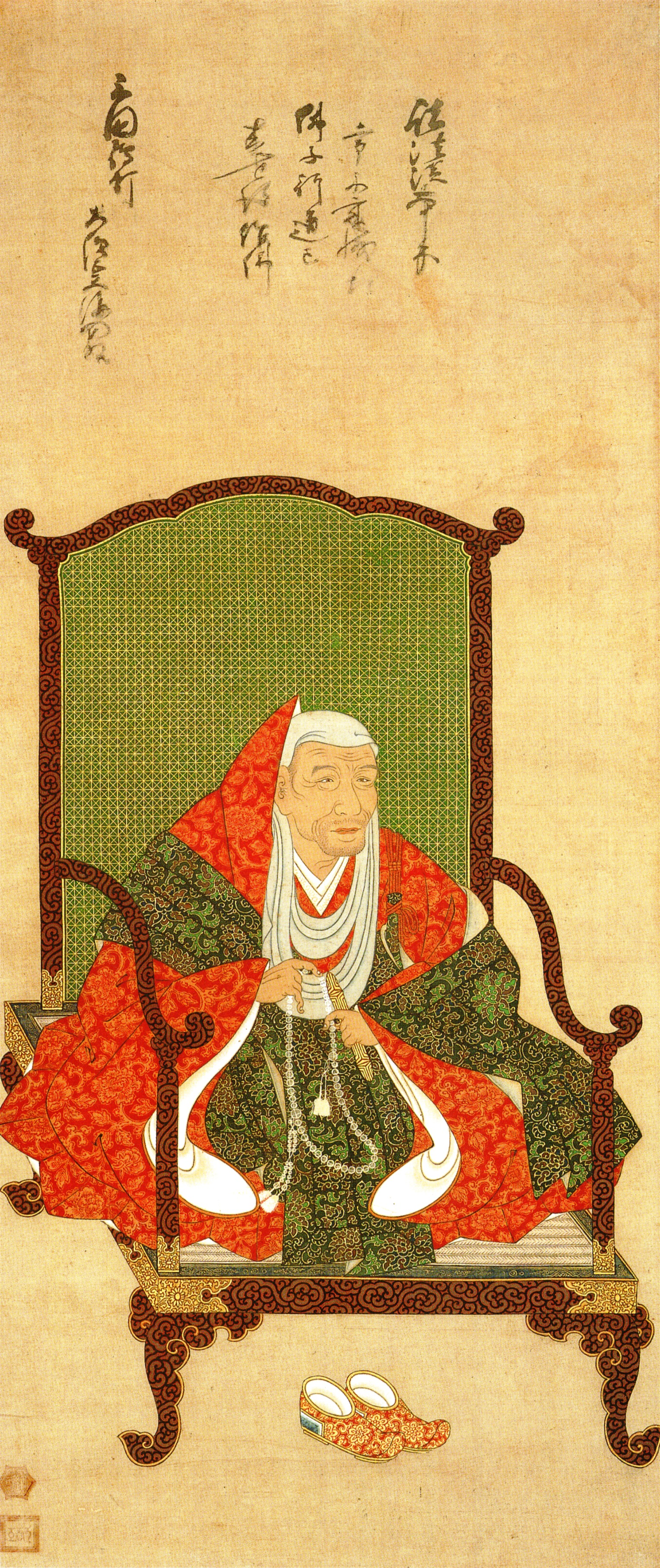
Portrait painting of Tenkai by Kimura Ryotaku (Rinnoji temple)

Tenkai (Japanese: 天海; 1536–13 November 1643) was an influential Japanese Tendai Buddhist monk of the Azuchi-Momoyama and early Edo periods. He achieved the rank of Daisōjō, the highest rank of the Tendai priesthood and was an influential advisor to various Shoguns, including Tokugawa Ieyasu. He also oversaw the project to carve and print the Kan'ei-ji Edition (also known as Tenkai Edition) of the Chinese Buddhist Canon, which was completed in 1648.

His Buddhist name was first Zuifū (随風), which he changed to Tenkai in 1590. Also known as Nankōbō Tenkai (南光坊 天海), he died on 13 November 1643, and was granted the posthumous title of Jigen Daishi (慈眼大師) in 1648.

== Life ==
Though believed to have been born in Aizu, much of Tenkai's early life is unclear. He became a monk at Ryūkō-ji Temple, adopting the name Zuihū. At age 14, he studied Tendai Buddhism under Kōshun (皇舜) at Konokawa-dera in Utsunomiya, Shimotsuke Province. He then pursued further studies at Enryaku-ji on Mount Hiei in Ōmi Province, Onjō-ji, and Kōfuku-ji in Yamato Province.

In 1571, when Oda Nobunaga attacked and burned Mount Hiei, Tenkai took refuge in Kai Province at the invitation of Takeda Shingen. Later, he moved to Inari-dō Hall in Kurokawa Castle (Wakamatsu Castle) under Ashina Morikatsu's invitation. Afterward, he resided at Chōraku-ji Temple in Kōzuke Province before moving to the North Hall of Muryōju-ji Temple (now Kita-in in Kawagoe, Saitama) in 1588, where he adopted the name Tenkai.

Tenkai's activities become more prominent after arriving at the North Hall of Muryōju-ji. At this time, he also served as abbot of Edosaki Fudō-in. According to records from Sensō-ji Temple, Tenkai was present in Tokugawa Ieyasu's camp during the Siege of the Hōjō clan, indicating he had originally come to the Kantō region on Ieyasu's behalf.

In 1599, Tenkai succeeded Gōkai as the abbot of the North Hall. He later acted as Ieyasu's advisor in negotiations with the Imperial Court and was appointed Tendai Overseer in 1607, residing at Nankōbō and working on the restoration of Enryaku-ji. In 1609, he was appointed Deputy Prelate.

In 1612, Tenkai began rebuilding the North Hall and renamed it Kita-in, establishing it as the main temple of the Kantō Tendai branch. In 1613, Ieyasu appointed him Abbot of Nikkō-zan, where he restored the main temple, Kōmyō-in. He was also heavily involved in the Hōkō-ji Bell Incident, which contributed to the outbreak of the Siege of Osaka.

In 1616, when Ieyasu was on his deathbed, he entrusted Tenkai with instructions regarding his posthumous title and funeral. After Ieyasu's death, Tenkai advocated for Ieyasu to be enshrined as Gongen in the Sannō Ichijitsu Shintō tradition, countering the proposal by Ishin Sūden and Honda Masazumi, who suggested the title Myōjin. Tenkai argued that Myōjin was inauspicious due to the fall of the Toyotomi clan following Toyotomi Hideyoshi's enshrinement as Toyokuni Daimyōjin. Ultimately, Ieyasu was enshrined as Tōshō Daigongen, and his remains were moved from Kunōzan to Nikkō.

Tenkai continued to serve as a consultant to the next two Tokugawa shōguns. In 1624, retired shōgun Tokugawa Hidetada and ruling shōgun Tokugawa Iemitsu asked him to establish Kan'ei-ji, a Buddhist temple to the northeast of Edo Castle in Ueno.

Tenkai worked to print and publish the entire Buddhist Canon in Japan. With shogunate support, the Kan'ei-ji Edition (Tenkai Edition) of the Tripiṭaka was completed in 1648. This printing project is considered one of the most significant achievements in Japanese printing history. Over 260,000 wooden movable type blocks from the Tenkai Edition still survive today.

Tenkai died in 1643 at the age of 108 (by traditional count). Five years later, the Imperial Court granted him the posthumous title Jigan Daishi.

== In popular media ==
- Tenkai appears as the main villain in the first Sakura Wars game.
- Tenkai appears as the video game Ryū ga Gotoku Kenzan!. He is the overarching secondary antagonist and final boss.
- In the game Sengoku Basara 3 and the anime Sengoku Basara: The Last Party the character Tenkai is portrayed as a cryptic monk who speaks in riddles and wields twin scythes. As with the rumor above, Tenkai is actually a re-skinned model of Akechi Mitsuhide, from the game and anime's predecessor. As of the UTAGE upgrade of the third game, the series established both Tenkai and Mitsuhide as a same person.
- In the Onimusha series, Samanosuke Akechi took on the identity of Tenkai in Onimusha: Dawn of Dreams.
- In the video game Shin Megami Tensei IV Tenkai appears as a National Defense Divinity once the party reaches a later portion of Tokyo.
- In the anime and light novels Mirage of Blaze, Tenkai's name has been mentioned in a crucial part of the story arc, being that an old incantation of his that he had invoked centuries ago would be the key for Lord Kagetora Uesugi and his team to stop their enemies in controlling the Feudal Underworld and the living world.
- He appears in the mobile game Fate/Grand Order as an antagonist of the event GUDAGUDA Imperial Capital Grail. He is truly Akechi Mitsuhide and he quickly reveals his identity.
- Tenkai appears in the games Nioh and Nioh 2, as both a Buddhist monk and a powerful onmyōji that helps the protagonists of both games. As with most works of fiction involving Tenkai, his real identity is that of Akechi Mitsuhide. In the games, his betrayal of Oda Nobunaga was a result of being manipulated by the sequel's antagonist Kashin Koji, becoming the monk "Tenkai" to repent for his crimes.

== Gallery ==
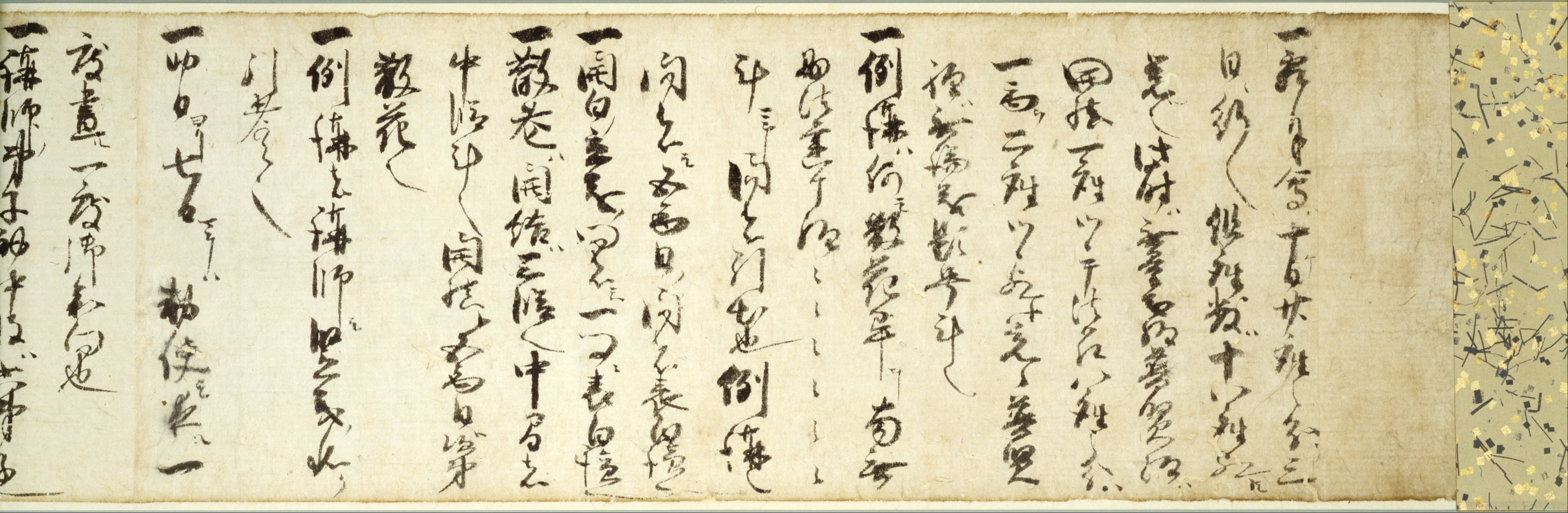
Rule of Shimotsukie written by Tenkai

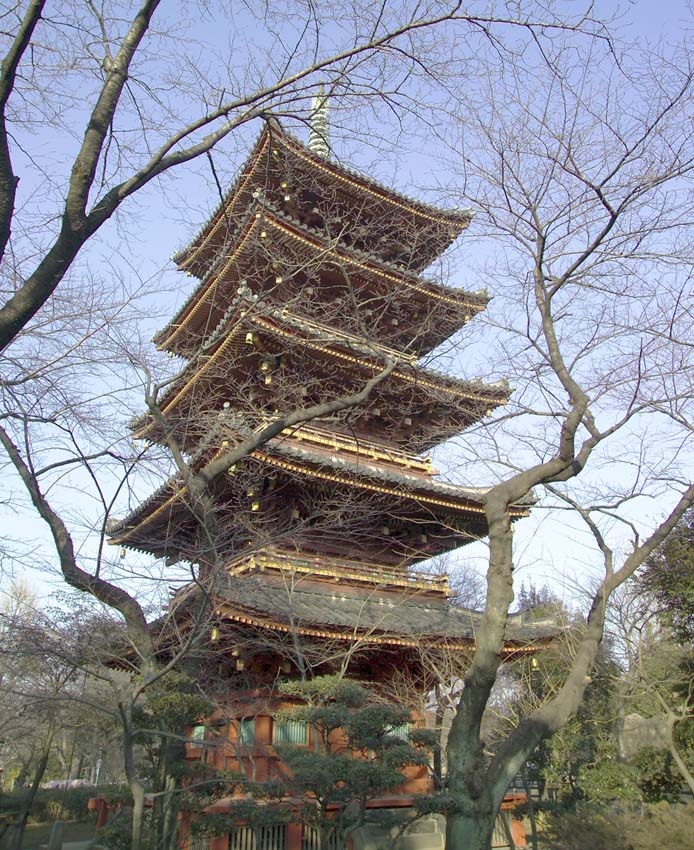
Tenkai established Kan'ei-ji in 1624

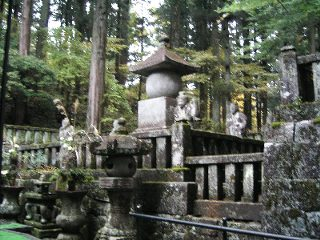
Tenkai's grave

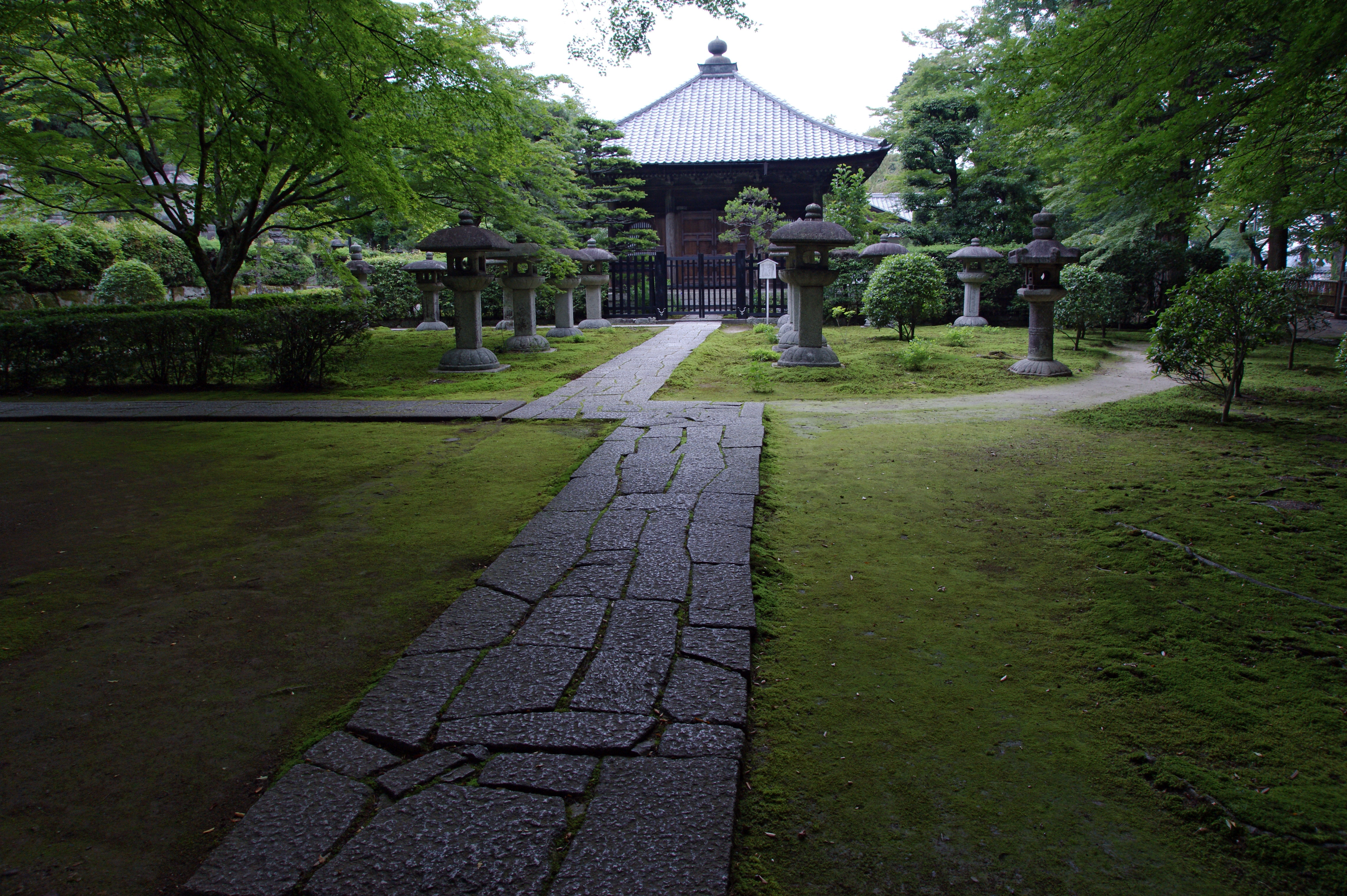
Jigendo in Sakamoto, Otsu

== External sites ==
- KITAIN site (in English)
- Kaneiji Temple(Japanese)
- Kaneiji Temple(English)
- Tokyo government (IPA, an agency of the Government of Japan) (in Japanese)
- Nikko Sightseeing association official website (in Japanese)
