= Niukanshōfu Shrine =

Shinto shrine in Wakayama Prefecture, Japan

Niukanshōfu-jinja 丹生官省符神社
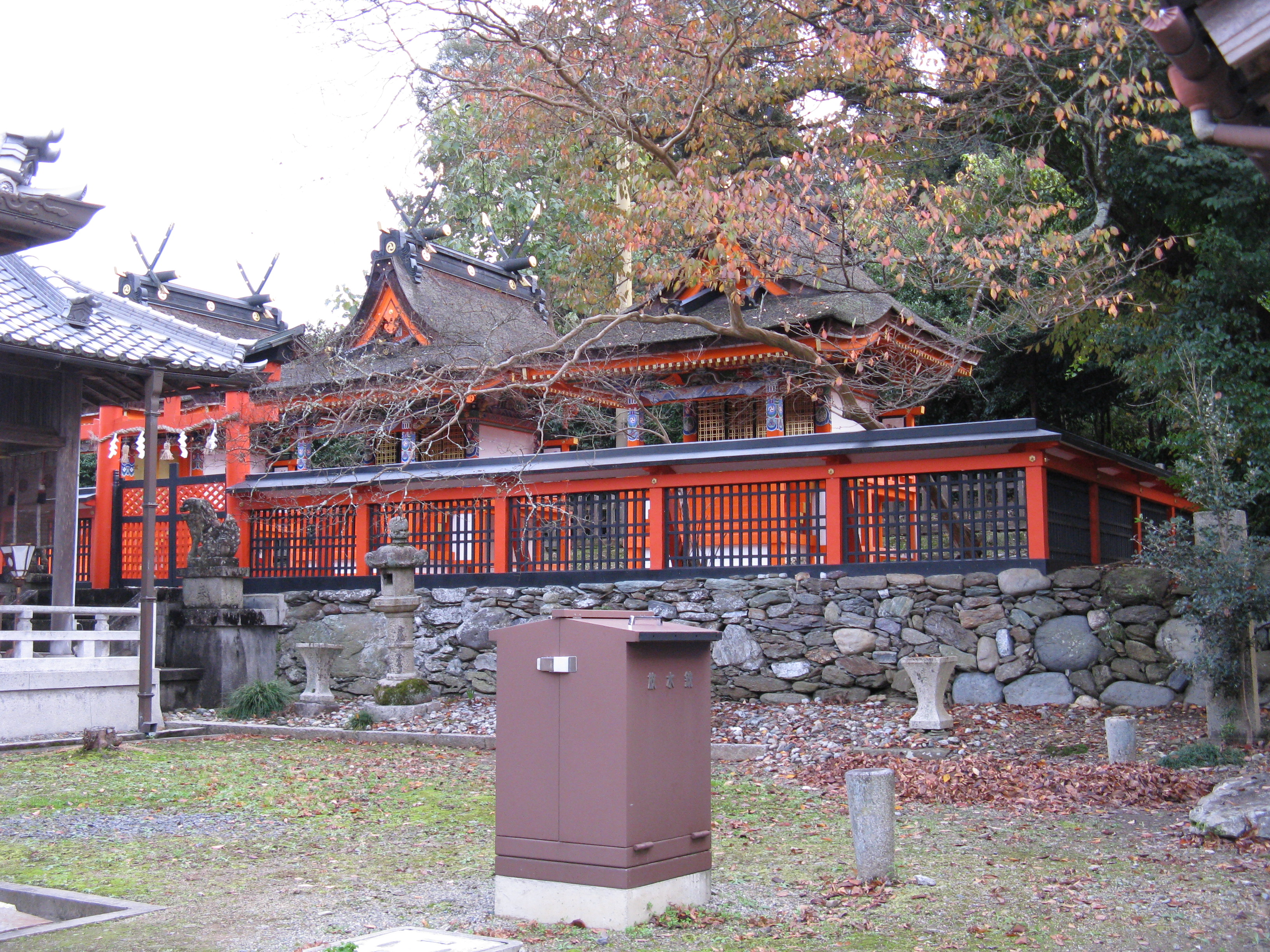
- The honden, or main hall

- Location within Japan

Religion
- Affiliation: Shinto
- Deity: Niutsuhime-no-Ōkami; Kōyamiko-no-Ōkami; Ōgetsuhime-no-kami; Ichikishimahime-no-Ōkami; Amaterasu; Emperor Ōjin (Hachiman); Ame-no-Koyane

Location
- Location: 835-banchi, Jison-in, Kudoyama-chō, Ito-gun, Wakayama-ken
- Interactive map of Niukanshōfu-jinja 丹生官省符神社
- Coordinates: 34°17′39″N 135°32′58″E

Architecture
- Established: 816

Website
- www16.ocn.ne.jp/~niujinja/

Niukanshōfu Shrine or Niukanshōbu Shrine (丹生官省符神社, Niukanshōfu-jinja, Niukanshōbu-jinja) is a Shinto shrine in Kudoyama, Ito district, Wakayama Prefecture, Japan.

In 2004, it was designated as part of a UNESCO World Heritage Site under the name Sacred Sites and Pilgrimage Routes in the Kii Mountain Range.
