= Jison-in =

Buddhist temple in Wakayama Prefecture, Japan

Coordinates: 34°17′42.69″N 135°33′0.67″E

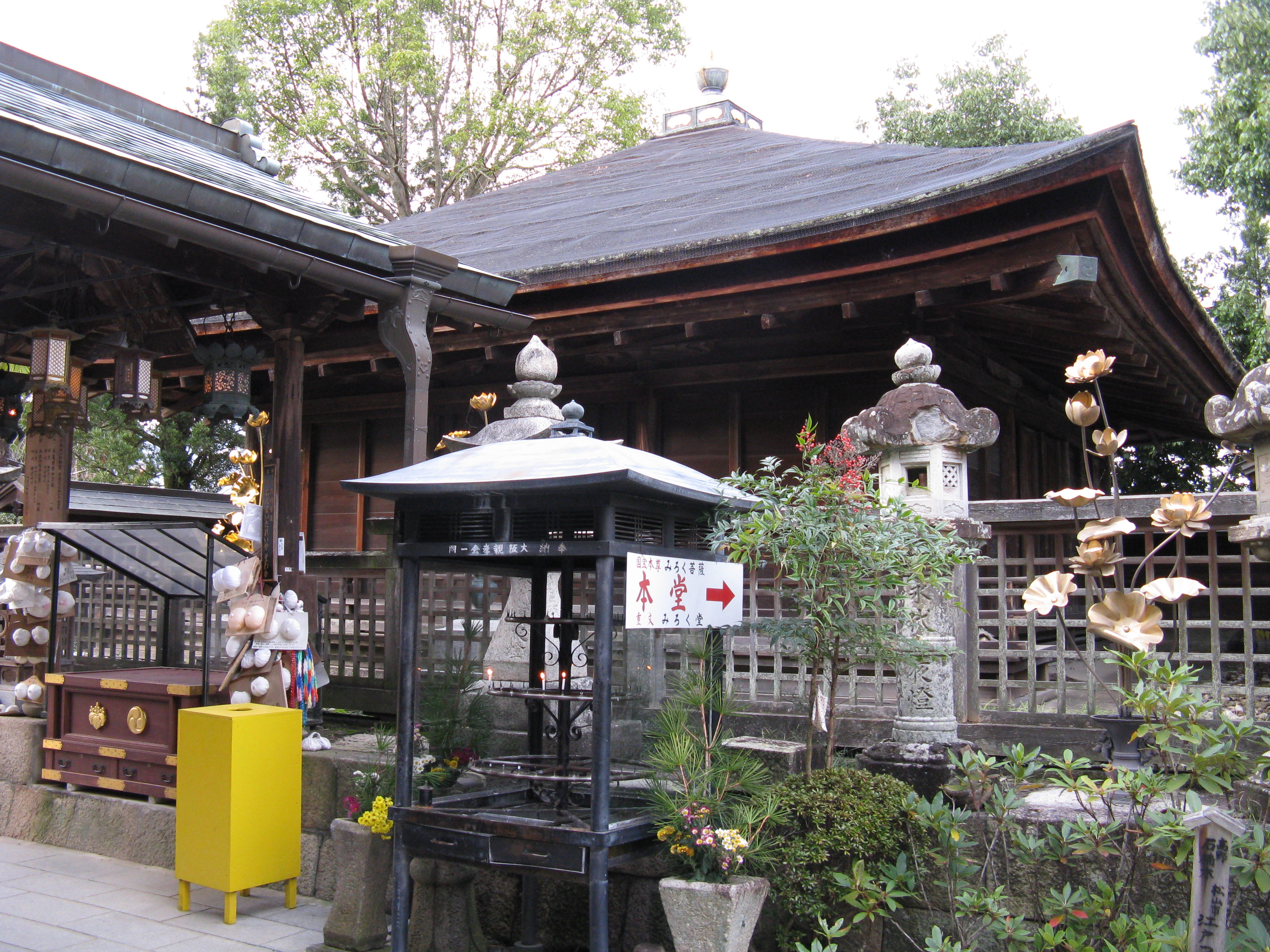
Jison-in's Miroku-dō

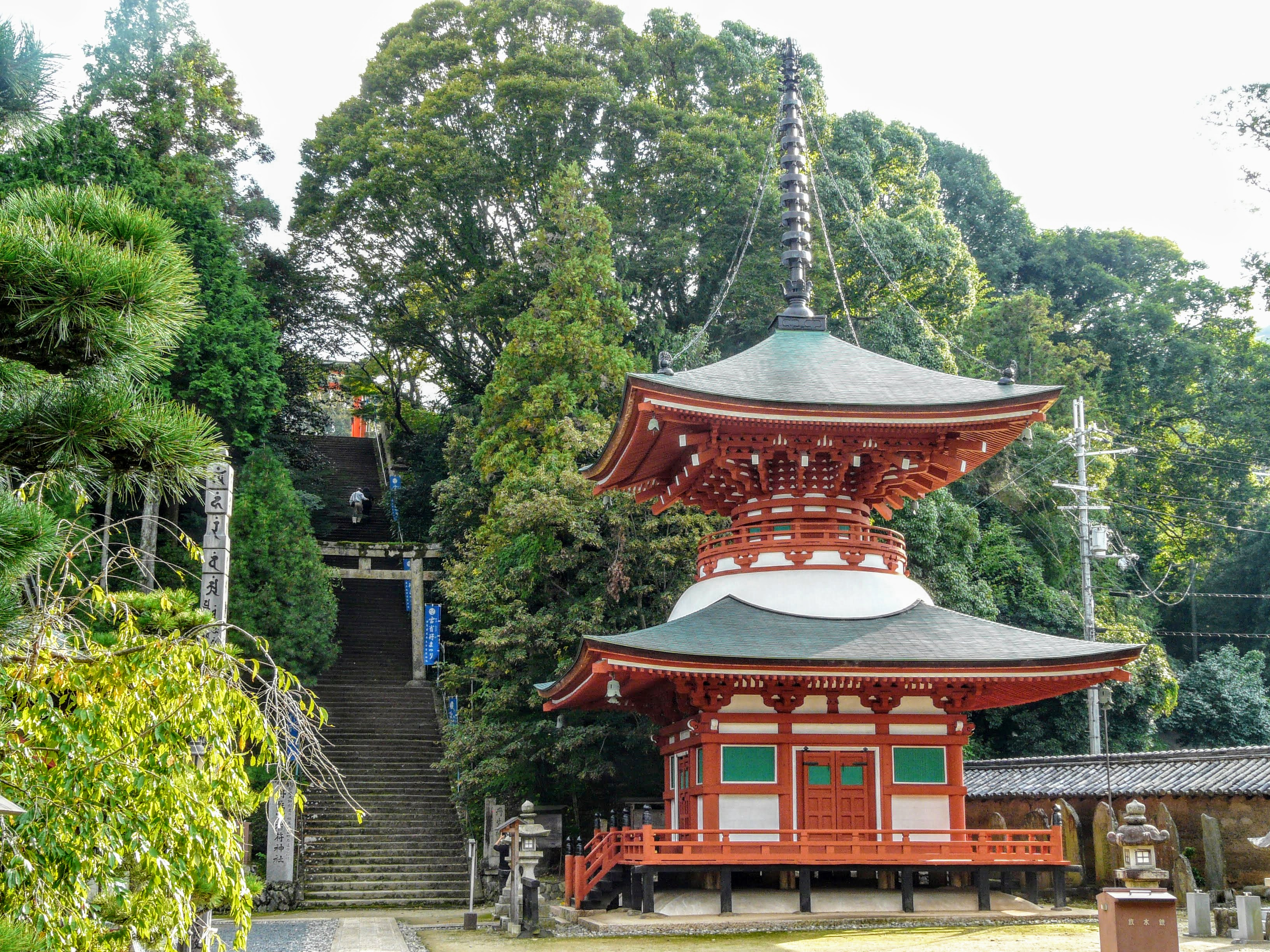
Jison-in's Tahō-tō, It was rebuilt in 1624

Jison-in (慈尊院) is a Buddhist temple in the town of Kudoyama that marks the entrance to the pilgrimage route of Koyasan.

== Temple ==
It is part of the Sacred Sites and Pilgrimage Routes in the Kii Mountain Range UNESCO World Heritage Site.

The Koyasan complex includes:

- Kongobu-ji, built by Kūkai in 816 as the principal stage for esoteric Buddhism on an 800m high mountain basin,
- Jison-in, built as an administrative office to facilitate the construction and management of Kongobu-ji,
- Niukanshofu Jinja, constructed as a guardian shrine to protect the Niukanshofu estate of Kongobu-ji, and
- Niutsuhime Jinja, situated in the Amano basin between Kongobu-ji and Jison-in. Closely connected to Koyasan, it enshrines Koya Myōjin who, legend tells, gave land to Kūkai when he choose the compound of Kongobu-ji, and Niu Myōjin, who guided him, and all of them are connected by the pilgrimage route Koyasan Choishimichi.

== See also ==
- List of National Treasures of Japan (sculptures)

== Sources ==
- Sacred Sites and Pilgrimage Routes in the Kii Mountain Range
