= Ōkubo-ji =

Buddhist temple in Kagawa Prefecture, Japan

Coordinates: 34°11′29″N 134°12′24.2″E

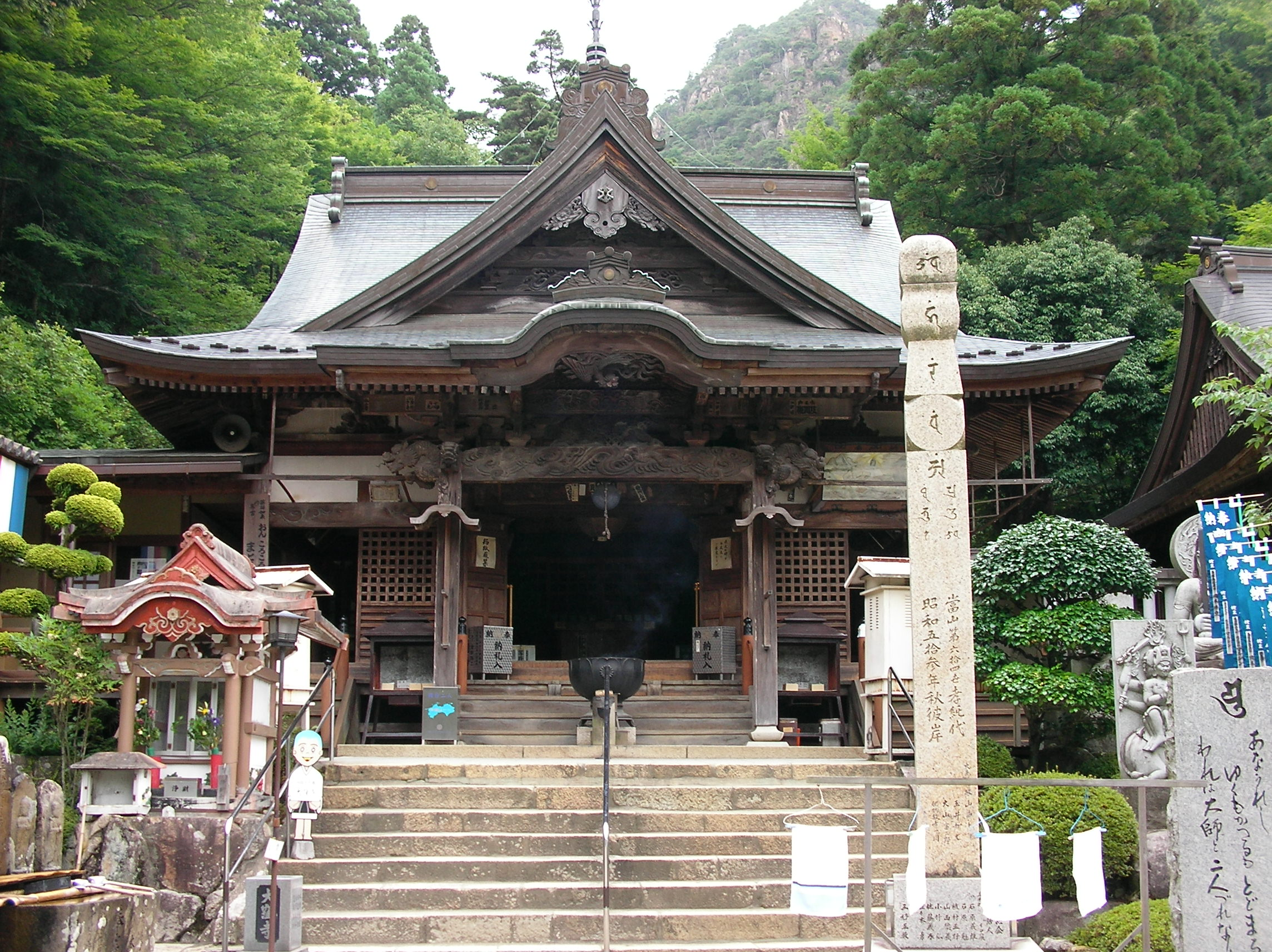
Ōkubo-ji Hondō

Ōkubo-ji (大窪寺) is a Shingon temple in Sanuki, Kagawa Prefecture, Japan. It is Temple 88 on the Shikoku 88 temple pilgrimage. Pilgrims leave their kongō-zue at the temple when completing the circuit. The Ōkubo-ji temple bell and pilgrim bells have been selected by the Ministry of the Environment as one of the 100 Soundscapes of Japan.

== See also ==
- Shikoku 88 temple pilgrimage
- 100 Soundscapes of Japan
