= Kongō-zue =

Walking staff

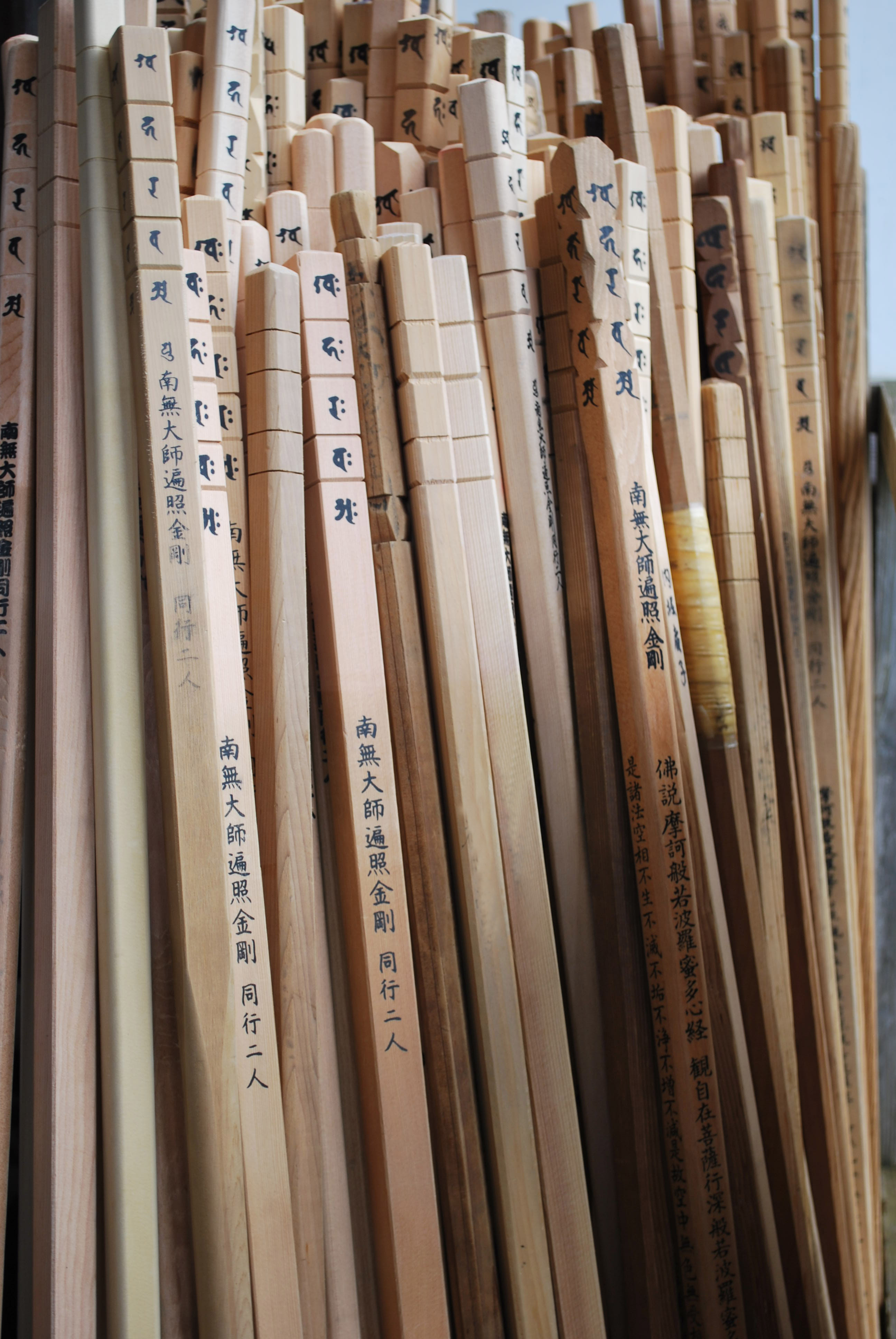
Kongō-zue left at Ōkubo-ji, the eighty-eighth and final temple of the Shikoku Pilgrimage

The kongō-zue or kongō-jō (金剛杖, 'vajra staff') is a wooden staff carried by yamabushi and pilgrims on the Shikoku Pilgrimage in Japan. The kongō-zue is said to represent the body of Kūkai and to support the pilgrim along the way; as such it is treated with respect, having its "feet" washed and being brought inside at the end of each day's journey. It is inscribed with the chant Namu-Daishi-Henjō-Kongō and Dōgyō-Ninin or "We two pilgrims together". By another tradition, it is carried aloft when crossing a bridge so that it does not touch the ground and wake Kōbō Daishi. Pilgrims leave their kongō-zue at Ōkubo-ji, the final temple, upon completion of the circuit. There is an occasional funerary practice in Shikoku and other parts of Japan whereby the decedent is dressed as a pilgrim and placed in the casket along with a staff and pilgrim's stamp book (nōkyōchō) for their final journey.

== See also ==
Oizuru (garment) is one of the sacred garments of the traditional dress of Japanese pilgrims.
