= Important cultural property (Japan) =

Object of high historical or artistic value

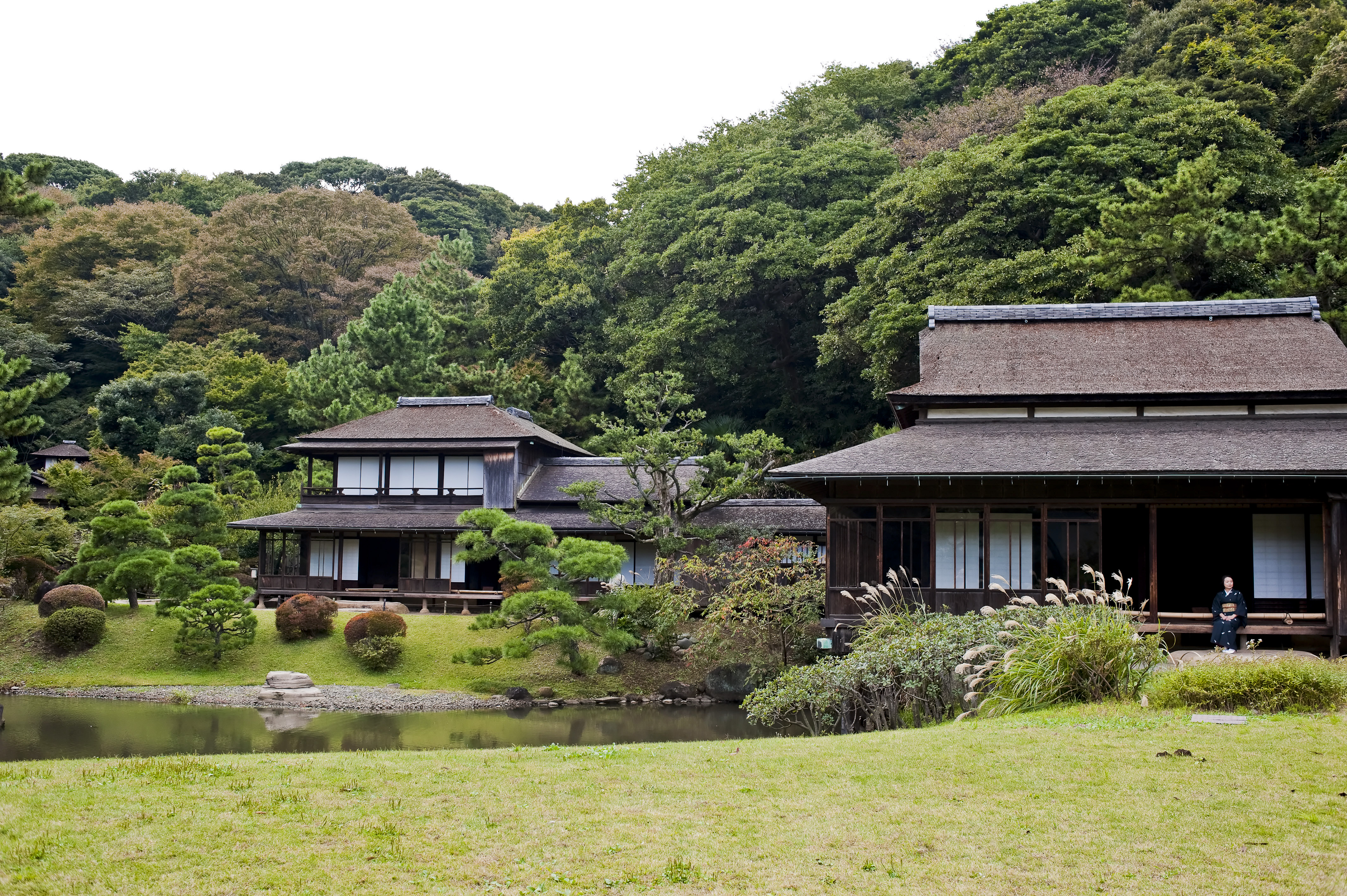
Sankei-en's Rinshunkaku in Yokohama is a nationally designated important cultural property of Japan.

An important cultural property (重要文化財, jūyō bunkazai) (Note: The term is often shortened into just jūbun (重文).) is an item officially classified as tangible cultural property by the Japanese government's Agency for Cultural Affairs (Ministry of Education, Culture, Sports, Science and Technology) and judged to be of particular importance to the history, arts, and culture of the Japanese people.

== Classification of Cultural Properties ==
To protect the cultural heritage of Japan, the Law for the Protection of Cultural Properties was created as a "designation system" (指定制度) under which important items are appropriated as Cultural Properties, (Note: In this article, capitals indicate an official designation as opposed to a simple, unofficial definition, e.g "Cultural Properties" as opposed to "cultural properties".) thus imposing restrictions to their alteration, repair and export. Besides the "designation system", there exists a "registration system" (登録制度), which guarantees a lower level of protection and support to Registered Cultural Properties.

Cultural Properties are classified according to their nature. Items designated as Tangible Cultural Properties (as opposed to Intangible Cultural Properties), cultural products of high historical or artistic value such as structures, paintings, sculptures, handicrafts, calligraphic works, ancient books, historic documents, archeological artifacts and other such items, can later, if they satisfy certain criteria, be designated either Important Cultural Properties or National Treasures (国宝), for especially valuable items. The designation can take place at the city (市定重要文化財, city designated Important Cultural Property), prefectural (県定重要文化財, prefecturally designated Important Cultural Property) or national (国定重要文化財, nationally designated Important Cultural Property) level. In this last case the designating agency is often not specified. Varying levels of designation can coexist. For example, Sankei-en, a traditional Japanese-style garden in Naka Ward, Yokohama, is both city and nationally designated as an Important Cultural Properties.

== Examples ==
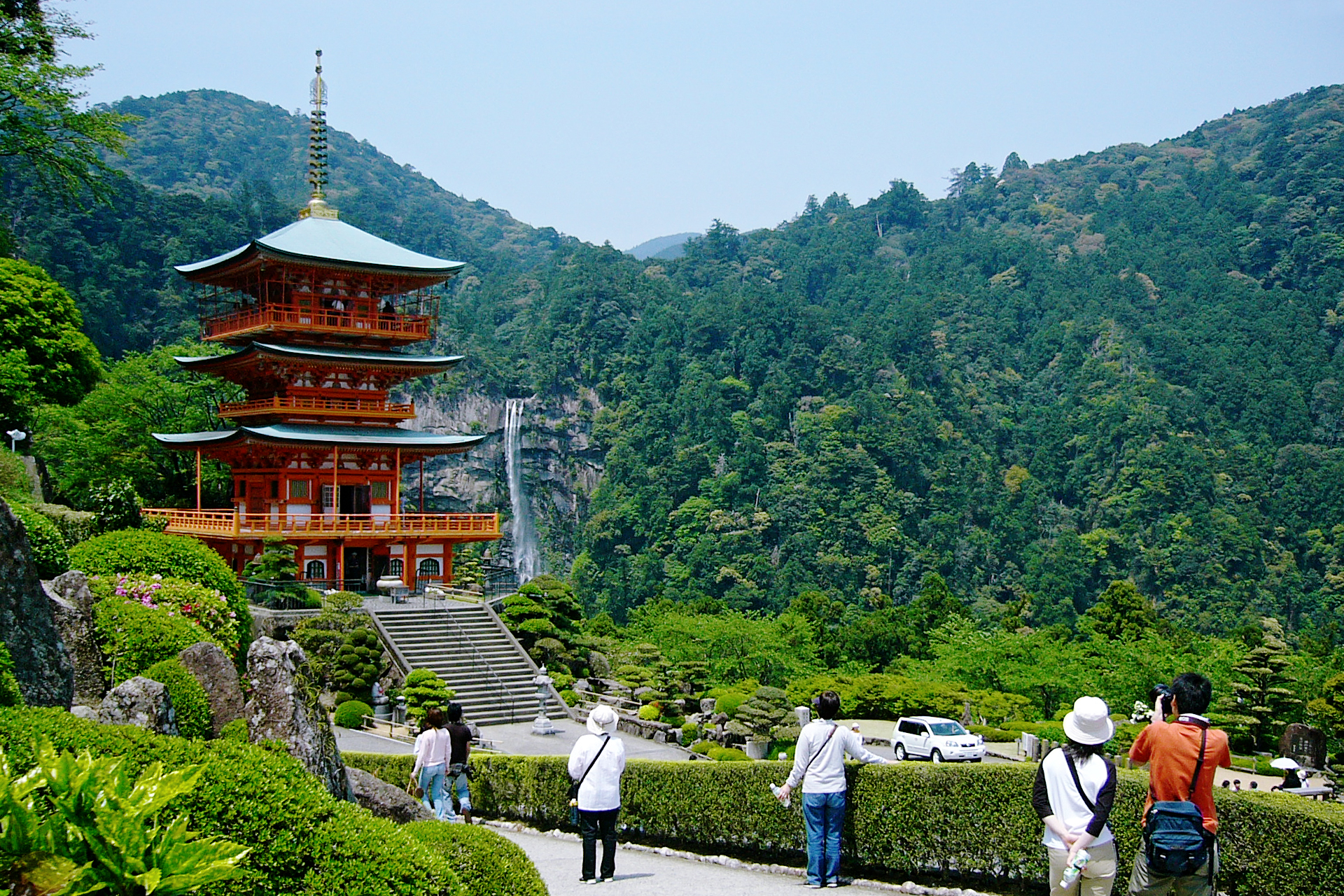
Seiganto-ji, Wakayama Prefecture

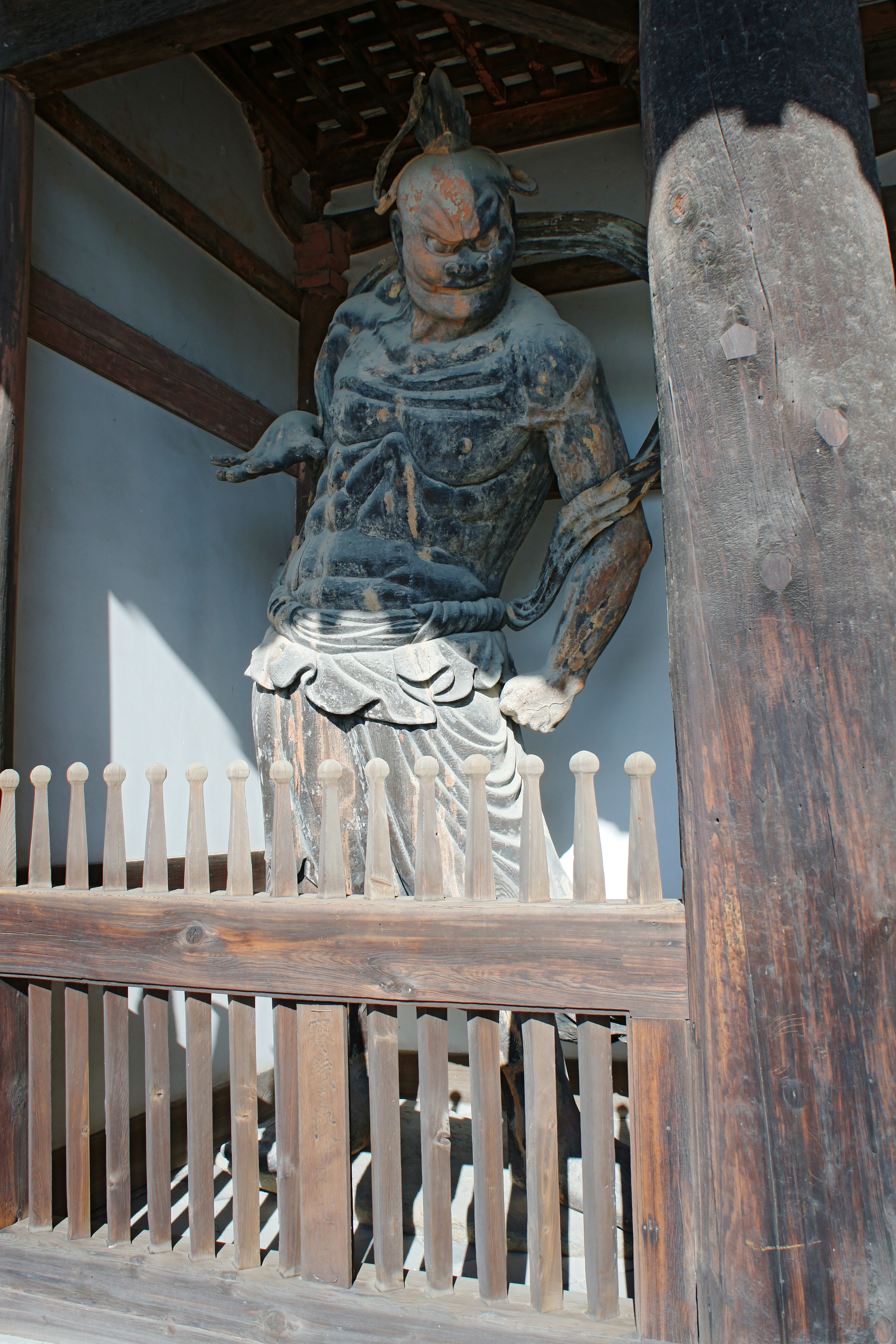
A Nio at Hōryū-ji, Nara

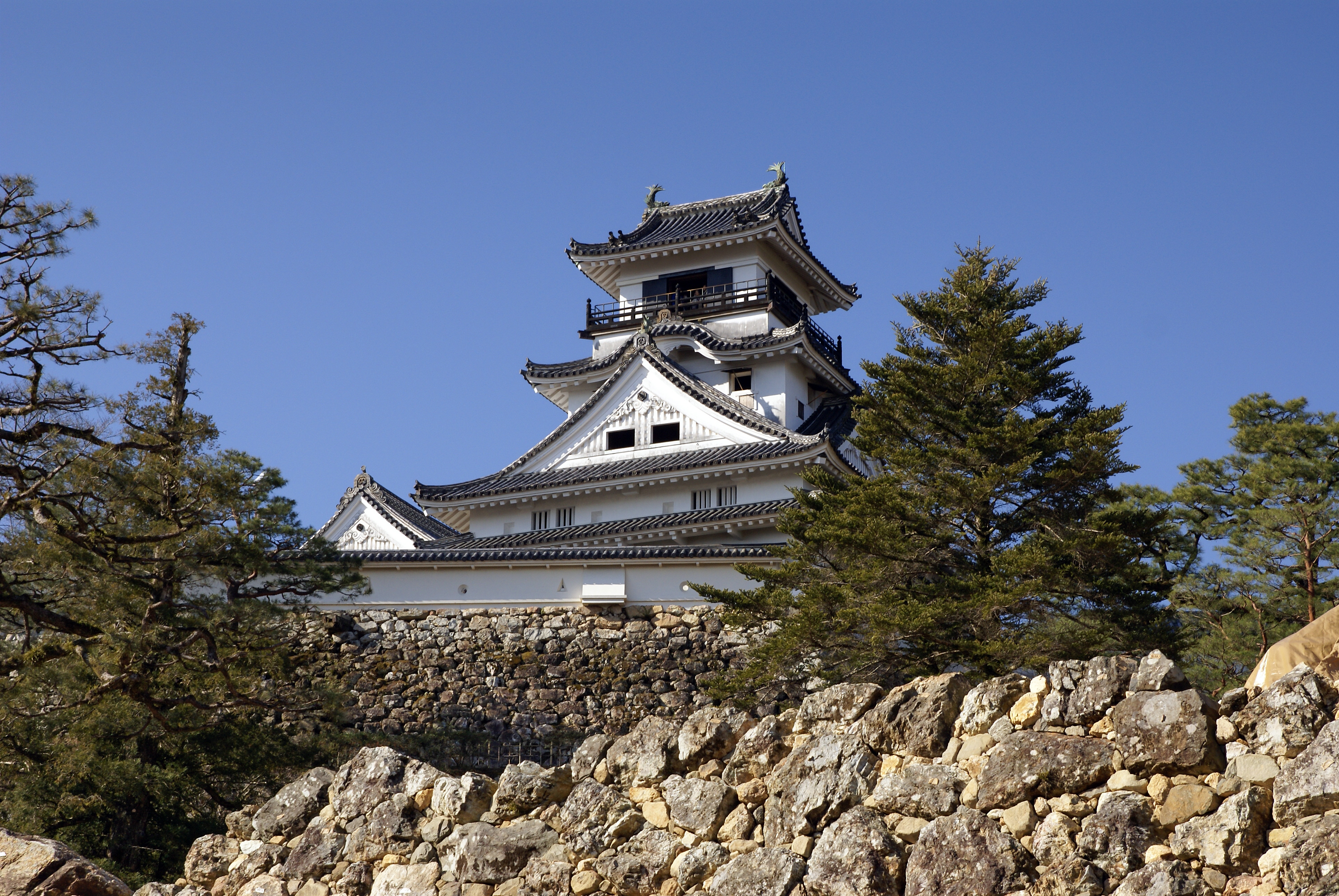
Kōchi Castle, Kōchi Prefecture

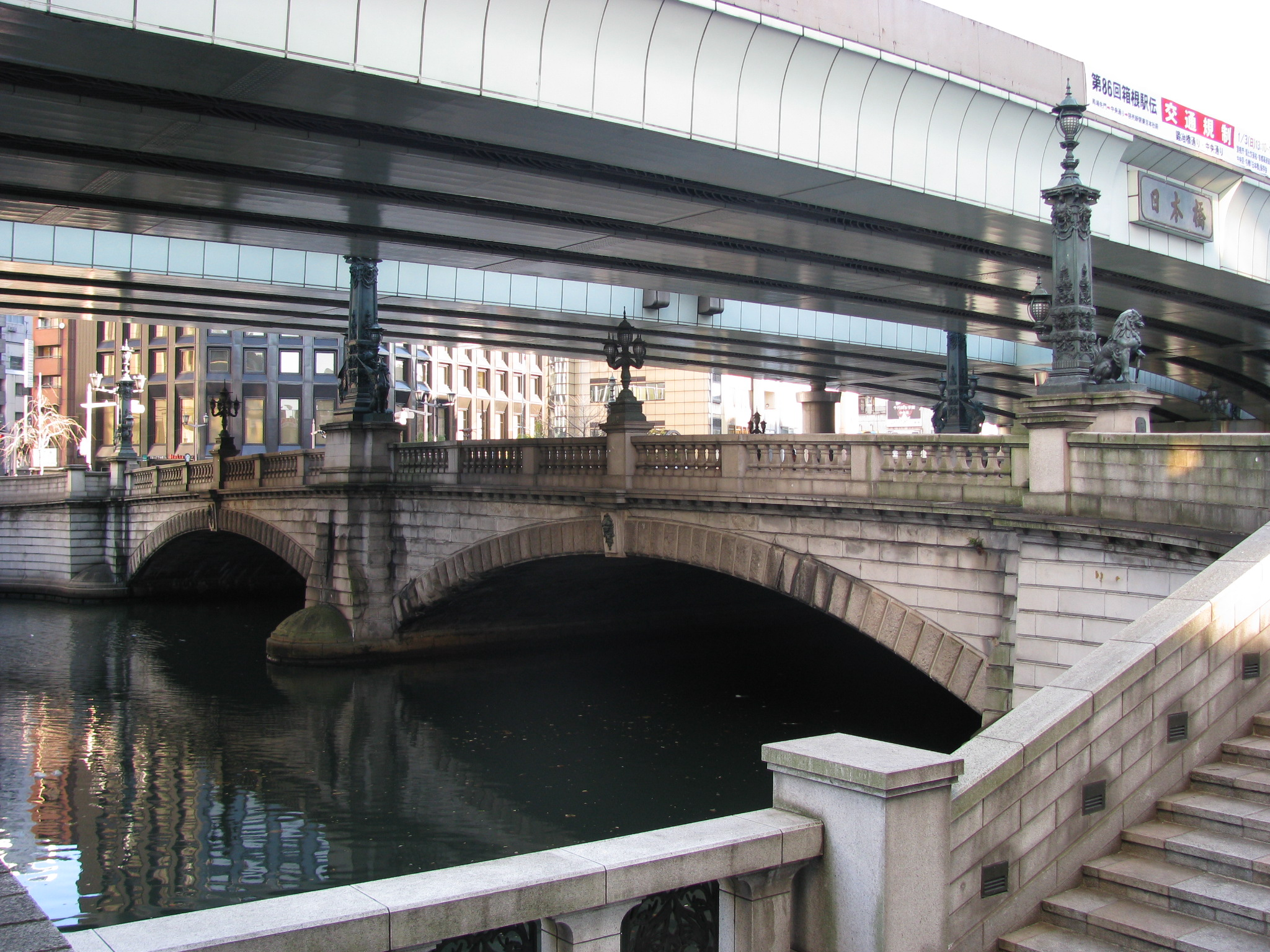
Nihon Bridge in Nihonbashi, Tokyo

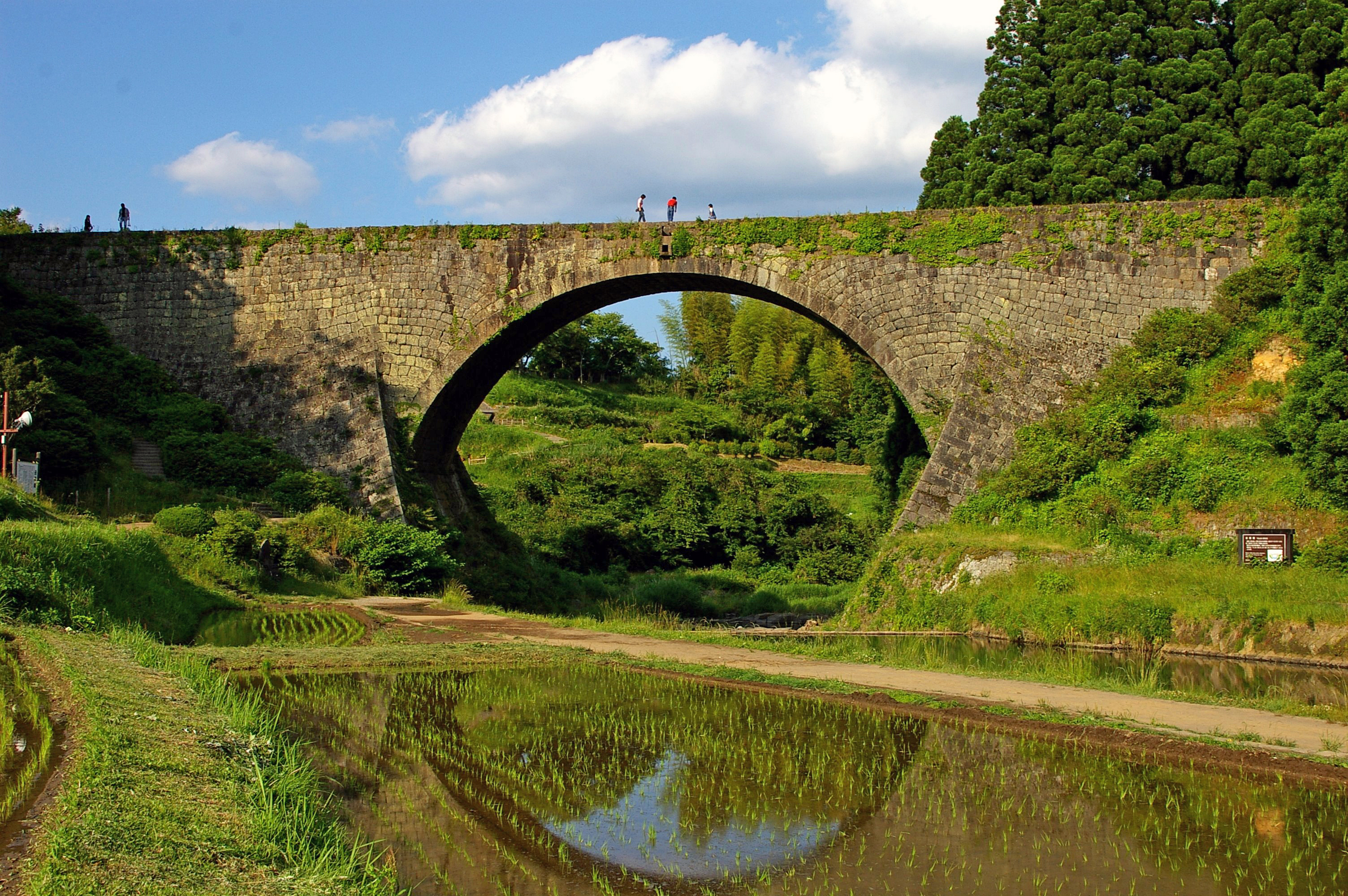
Tsūjun Bridge, Kumamoto Prefecture

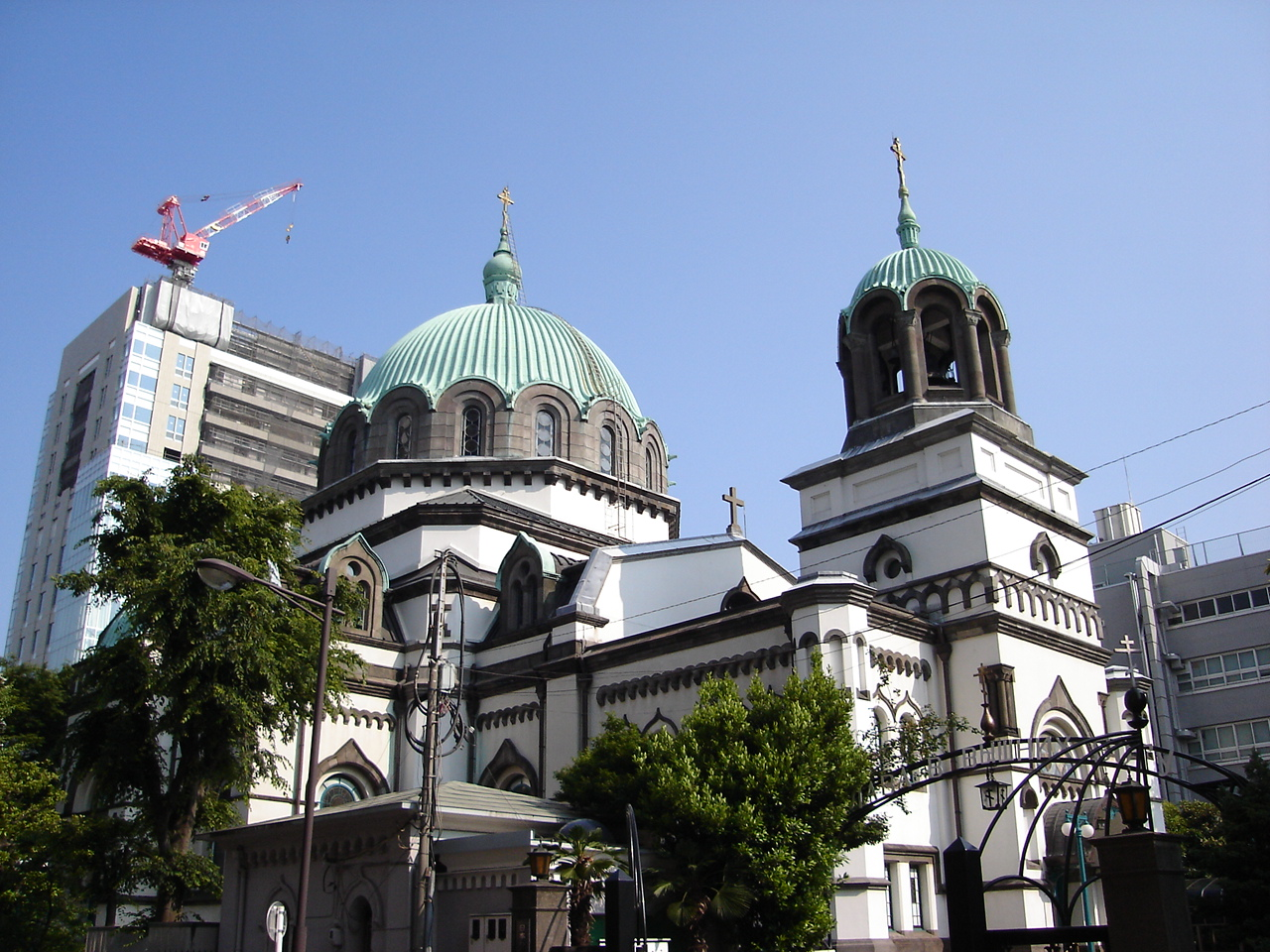
Holy Resurrection Cathedral in Tokyo

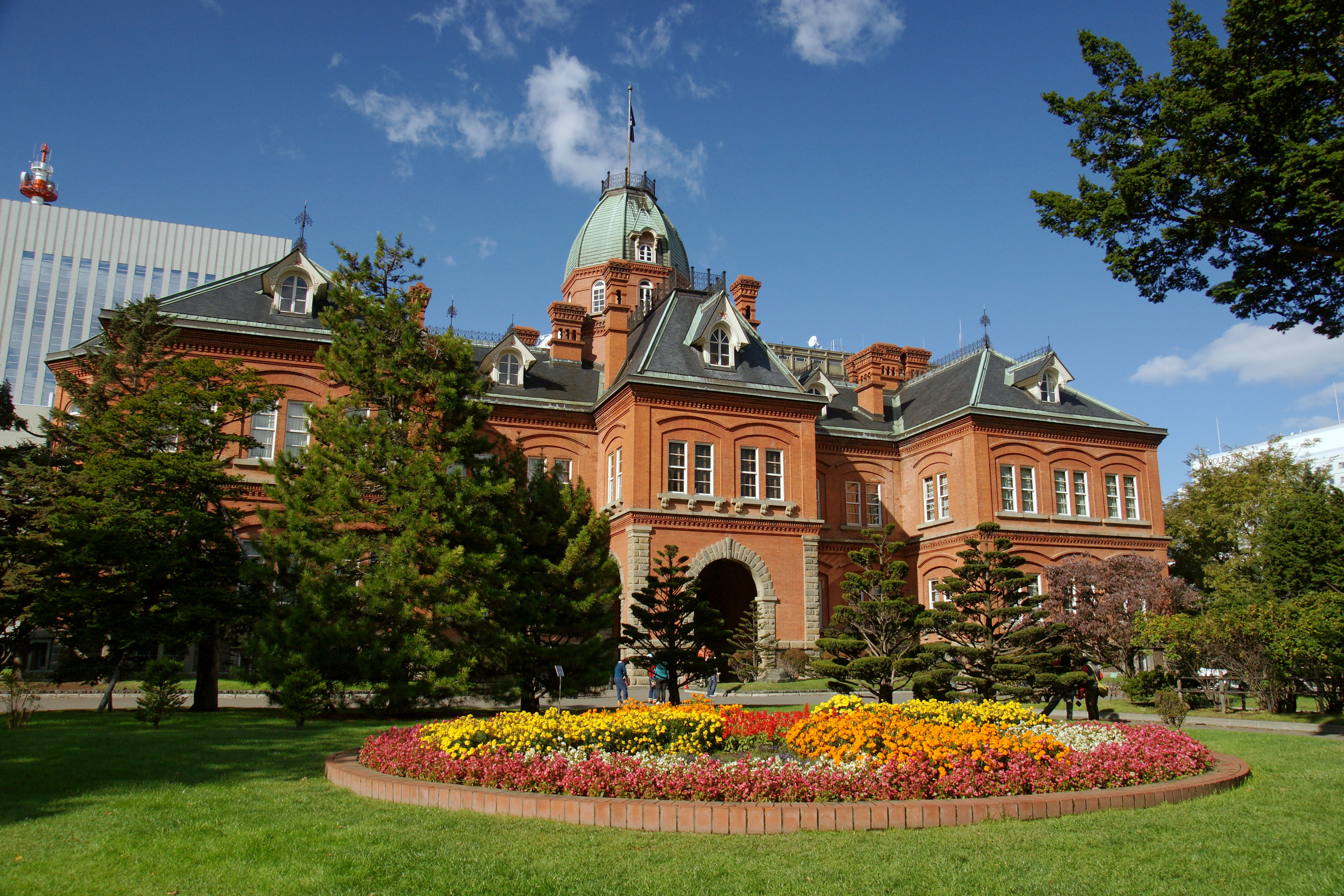
The Former Hokkaidō government office building

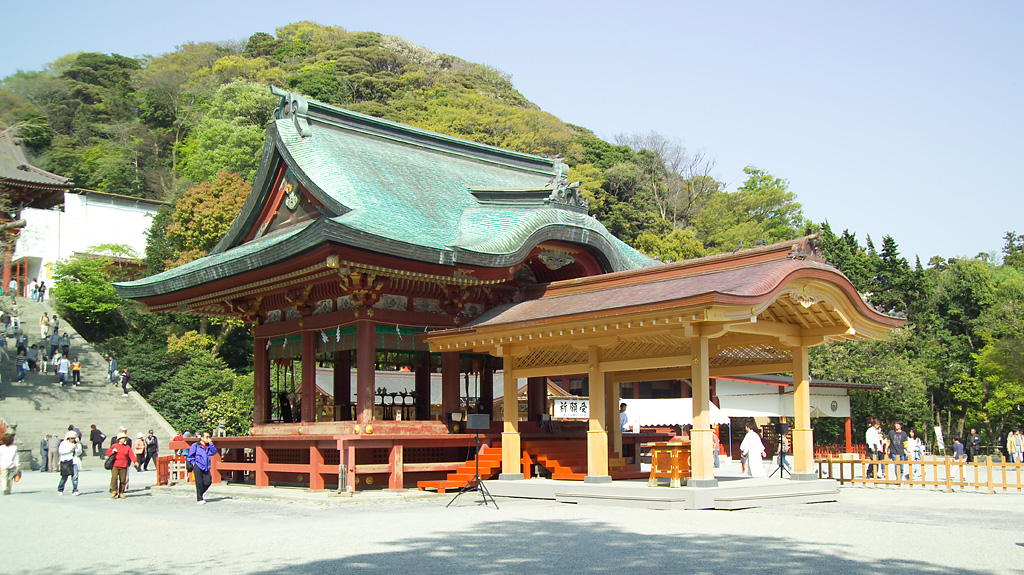
Tsurugaoka Hachimangū in Kamakura, Kanagawa prefecture

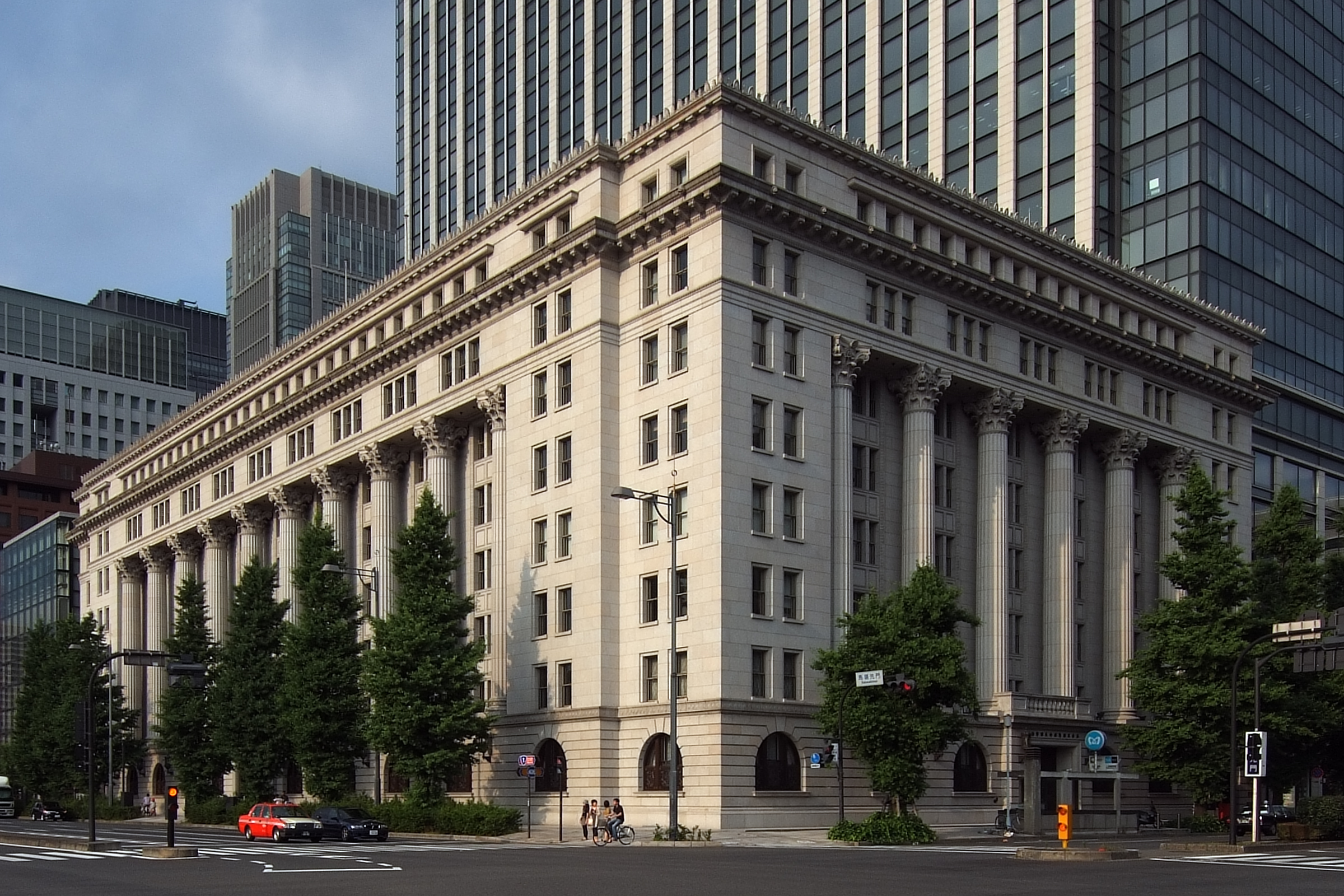
Meiji Seimei Kan in Tokyo

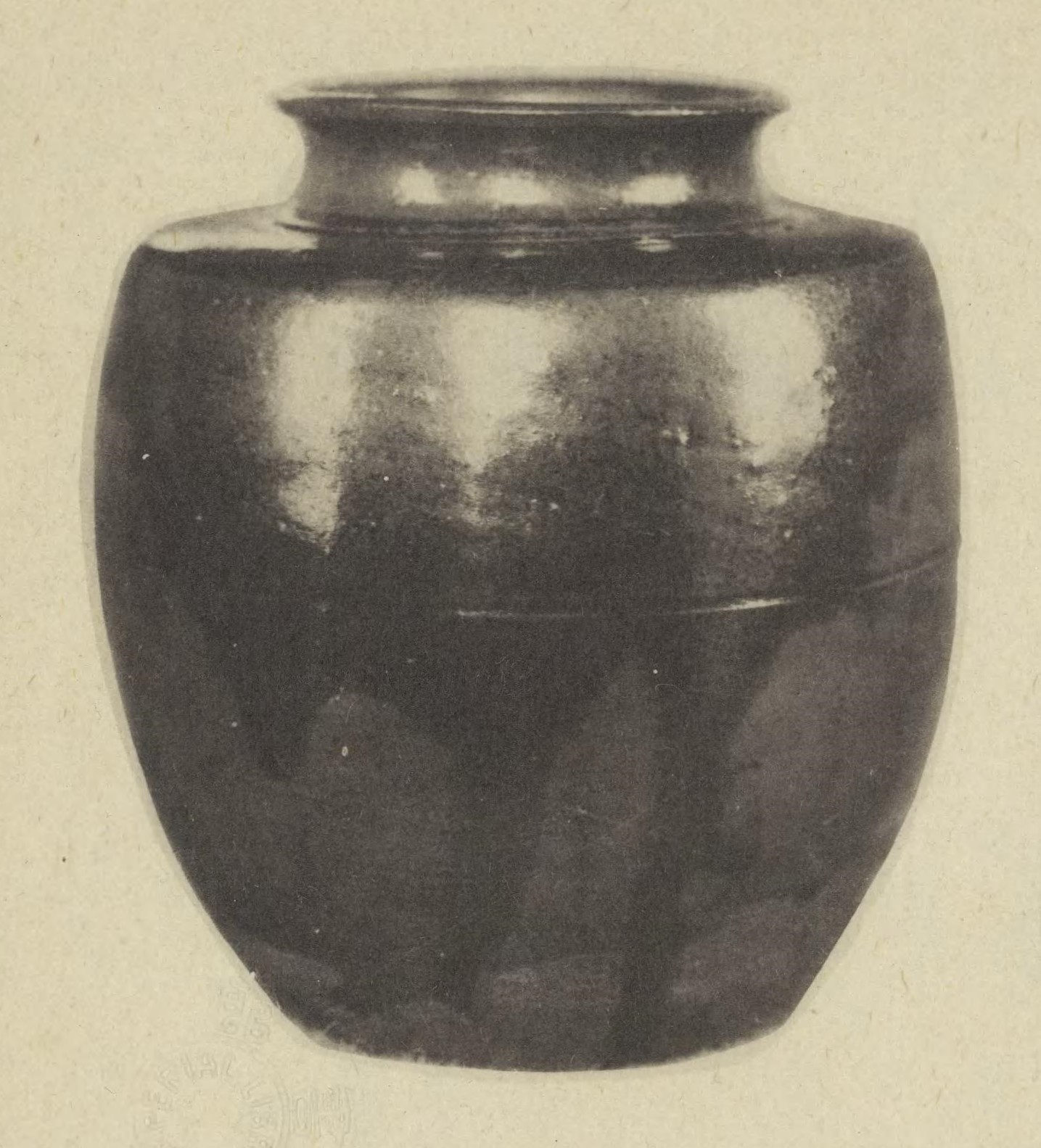
Hatsuhana tea caddy, one of the special tea utensils, kept at the Tokugawa Memorial Foundation

== Lists of Important Cultural Properties of Japan ==
- List of Important Cultural Properties of Japan (Asuka period: structures)
- List of Important Cultural Properties of Japan (Nara period: structures)
- List of Important Cultural Properties of Japan (Heian period: structures)
- List of Important Cultural Properties of Japan (Kamakura period: structures)
- List of Important Cultural Properties of Japan (Taishō period: structures)
- List of Important Cultural Properties of Japan (Shōwa period: structures)
- List of Cultural Properties of Japan – structures (Okinawa)

== See also ==
- Cultural Properties of Japan
