= Kongō-ji =

Buddhist temple in Osaka, Japan

Kongō-ji 金剛寺
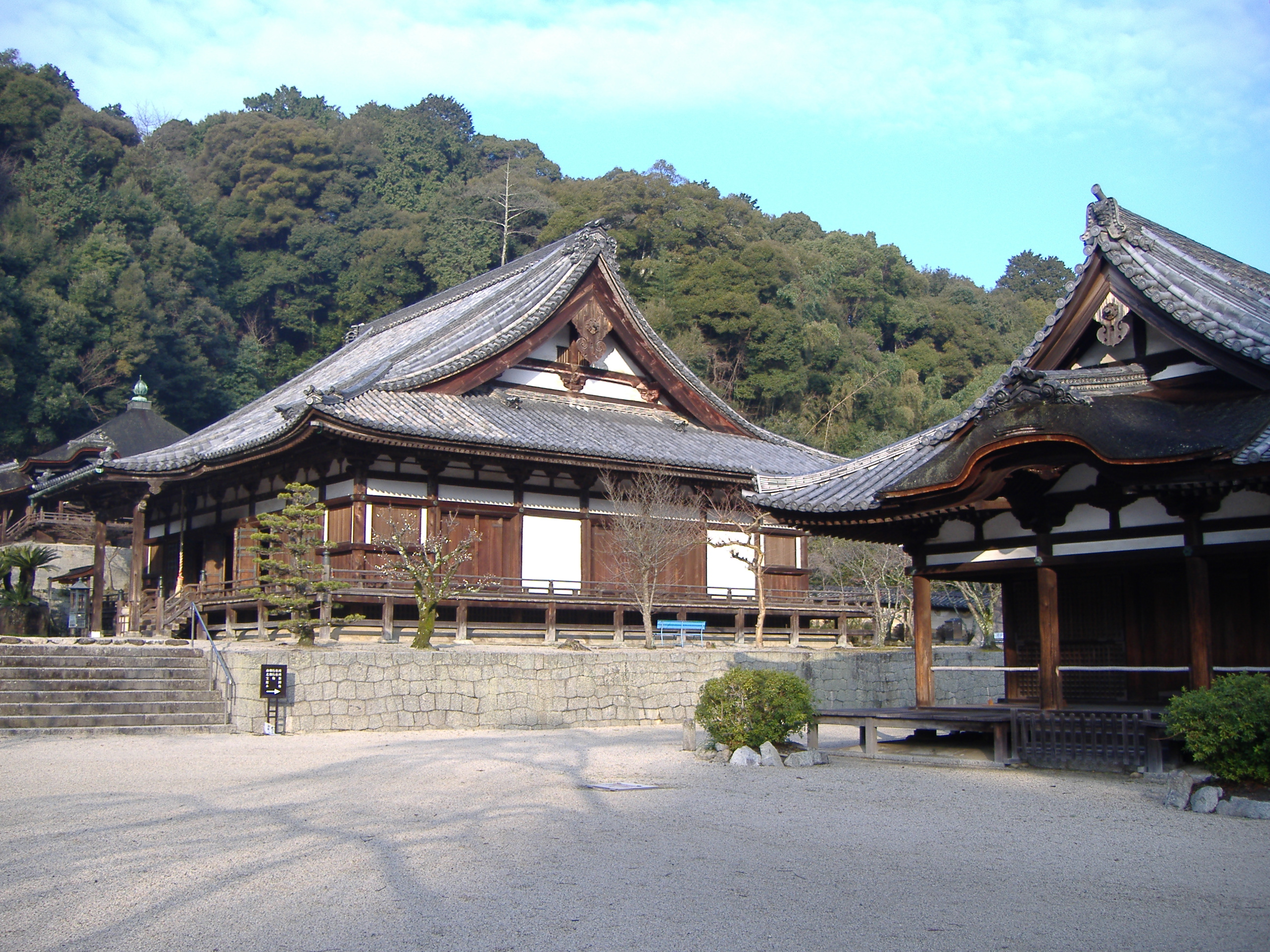
- Temple grounds with main hall and refectory

Religion
- Affiliation: Buddhist
- Deity: Dainichi Nyorai
- Rite: Shingon Omuro

Location
- Location: 996 Amano-chō, Kawachinagano, Osaka Prefecture, Osaka-fu
- Country: Japan
- Interactive map of Kongō-ji 金剛寺
- Coordinates: 34°25′43″N 135°31′46″E

Architecture
- Founder: Gyōki
- Established: 729–748

Website
- Official website

Kongō-ji (金剛寺) is a Buddhist temple in Kawachinagano, Osaka, Japan. It is the head temple of the Shingon Omuro sect. and also known under its mountain-name as Amanosan Kongō-ji (天野山 金剛寺). It is the 7th temple on the Shin Saigoku 33 Kannon Pilgrimage (新西国三十三箇所) and is notable for the large number of designated cultural properties. The precincts of the temple were designated a National Historic Site of Japan in 1934 with the area under protection expanded in 2011.

== History ==
According to temple legend, one of the 84,000 stupas built by the Indian Emperor Ashoka was on this land. The temple was founded during the Tenpyō era (729–749) through imperial request of Emperor Shōmu by the priest Gyōki. During the early Heian period, Kōbō-Daishi (Kūkai), the founder of Shingon Buddhism is said to have studied here.

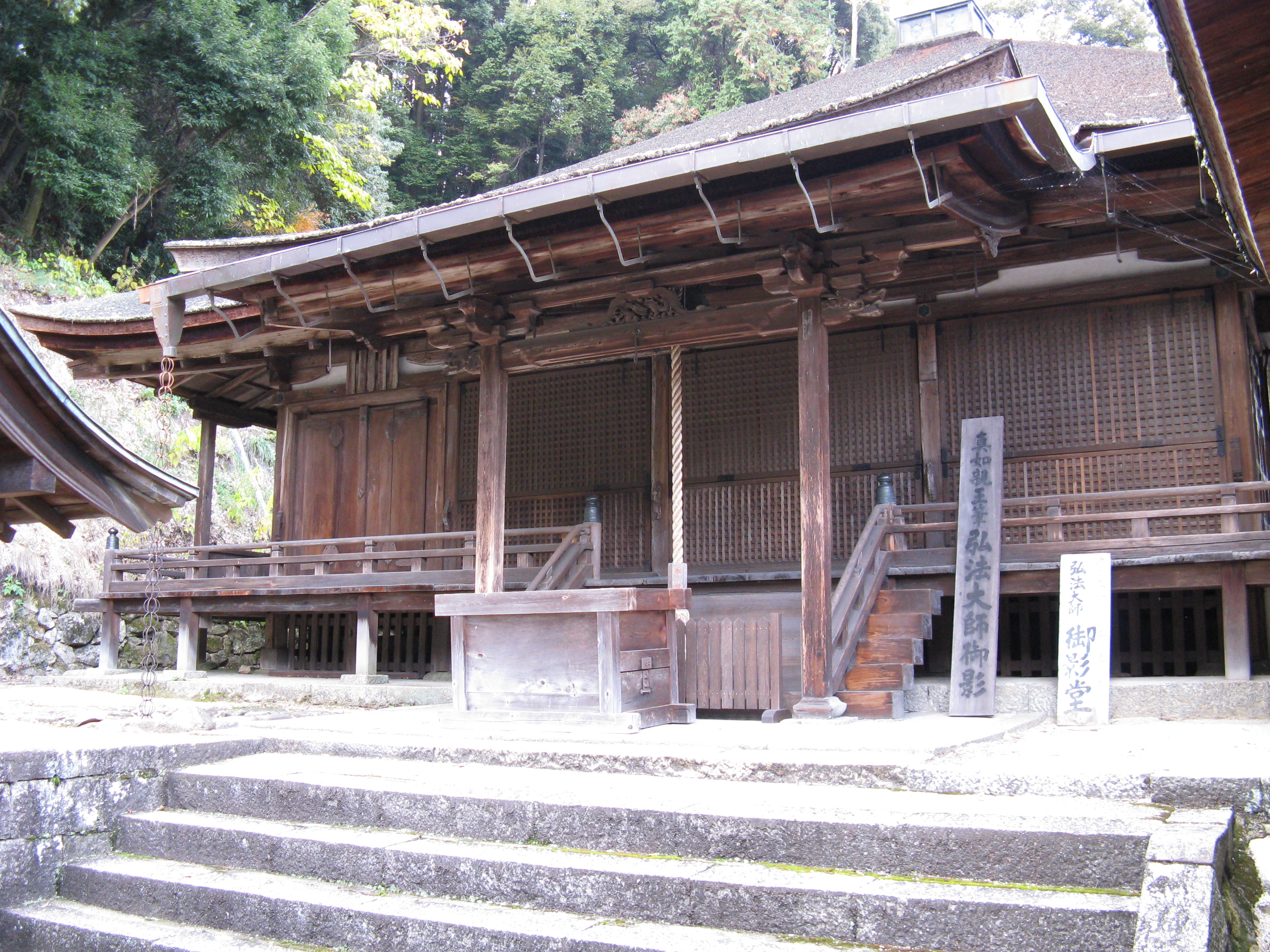
Mie Hall

Over 400 years of its existence the temple fell into ruins. However at the end of the Heian period, the Kōyasan priest Akan (阿観) (1136-1207) was living in the area. Deeply revered and supported by Emperor Go-Shirakawa and his sister Hachijō‐in Akiko (1137–1211) he revived the temple. Akan brought an image of Kōbō-Daishi drawn by Prince Takaoka (真如親王, Takaoka-shinnō) (799–865) from Kōyasan and had it installed in the newly erected Miei Hall. While holding memorial services for Kōbō-Daishi, a monastery consisting of a Main Hall (Kondō), tahōtō, rōmon and refectory ermerged. The current structures are from this time. It became the head temple for two generations and was known as Women's Kōyasan since, contrary to many other temples at the time, women were allowed to pray here.

At the end of the Kamakura period, Kongō-ji became associated with Emperor Go-Daigo and was the base of the Southern Court during the Nanboku-chō period. From 1354 to 1360 Emperor Go-Murakami set up a temporary loding at the Mani-in (摩尼院) subtemple and the refectory. During that period, three emperors of the Northern Court, Kōgon, Kōmyō and Sukō, were imprisoned in the Kanzō-in (観蔵院) subtemple of Kongō-ji. Kōmyō was released in 1355, the other two in 1357.

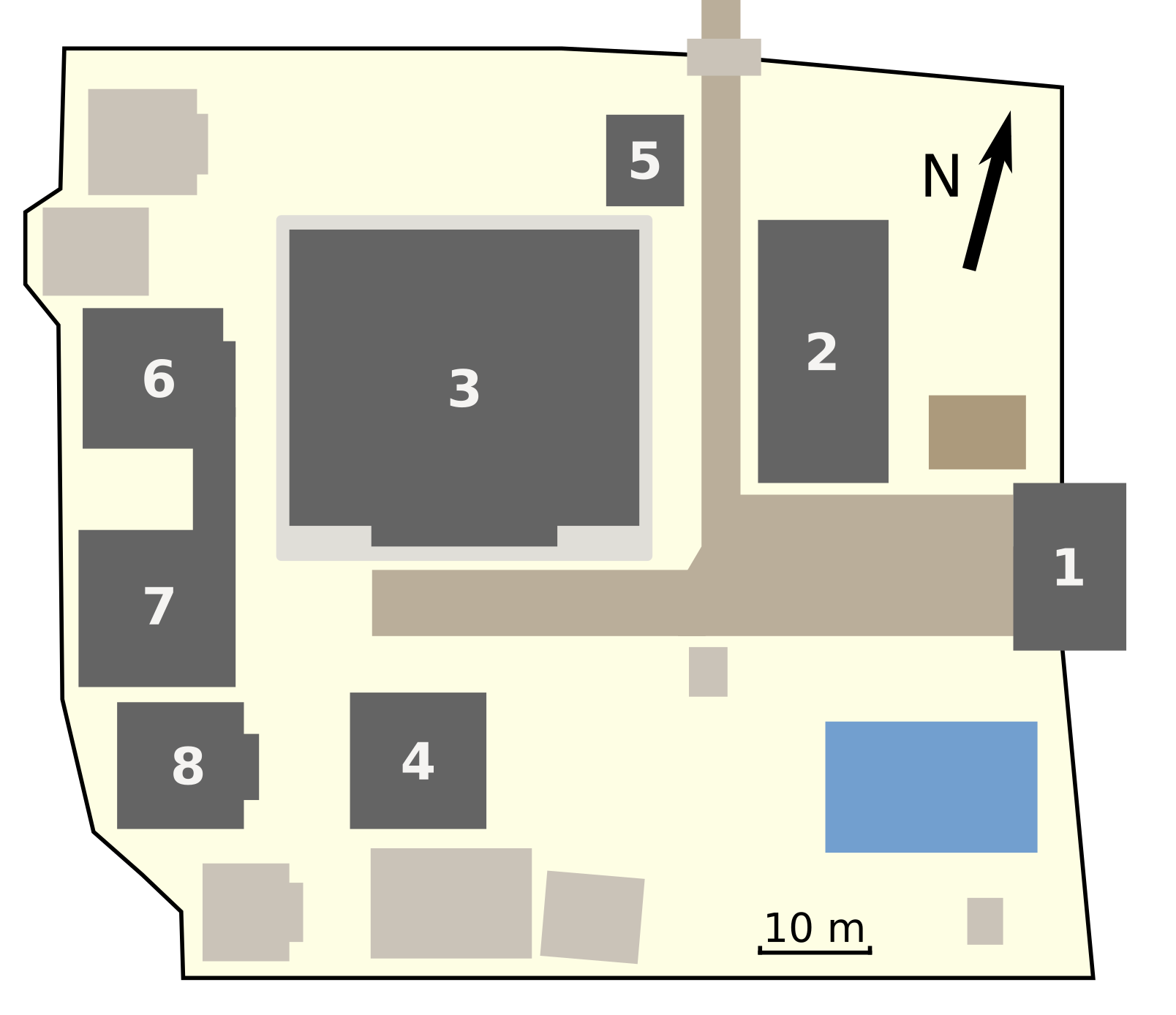
Temple layout

At the end of the Nanboku-chō period, the production of rice, charcoal, lumber and most notably amanosake contributed to the economy of the temple. There were more than 90 sub-temples at the time. Under the patronage of Oda Nobunaga and Toyotomi Hideyoshi, the temple flourished and owned 307 koku land at the end of the Edo period. That's one of the reasons that a large number of cultural properties has been preserved at the temple. The buildings were repaired in 1606 by Toyotomi Hideyori and in 1700 by decree of Tokugawa Tsunayoshi.

No major works happened until 2009, when the disassembly and repair of the buildings was decided. This coincided with the repair of the group of main sculptures and their subsequent designation as National Treasure in 2017. Preservation works were subsidized by the Agency for Cultural Affairs and Kawachinagano city for a total of 1.65 billion yen. They were carried out over a period of 9 years starting in 2009.

== Precinct ==
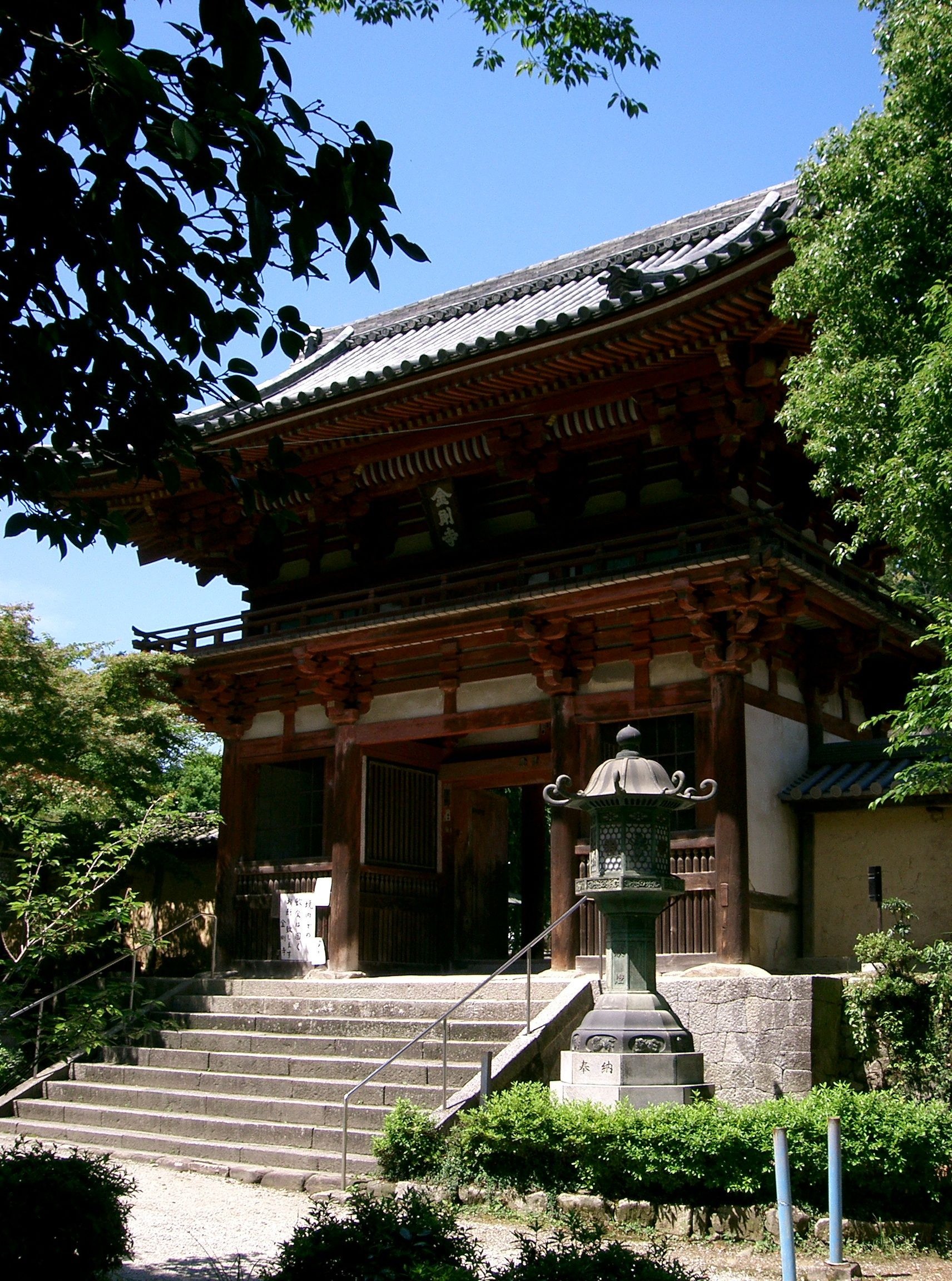
temple gate

The precinct is entered through the Sanmon temple gate (1). It is a three ken wide tower gate (rōmon) painted red, has an irimoya-style (Note: (irimoya-zukuri, 入母屋造): a hip-and-gable roof combining a ridge and two gable pediments on the upper part with a hipped roof on all sides in the lower part of the roof) roof of hongawara (Note: (hongawarabuki, 本瓦葺): a tile roof composed of flat broad concave tiles and semi-cylindrical convex tiles covering the seams of the former) type and dates to the Kamakura period between 1275 and 1332.

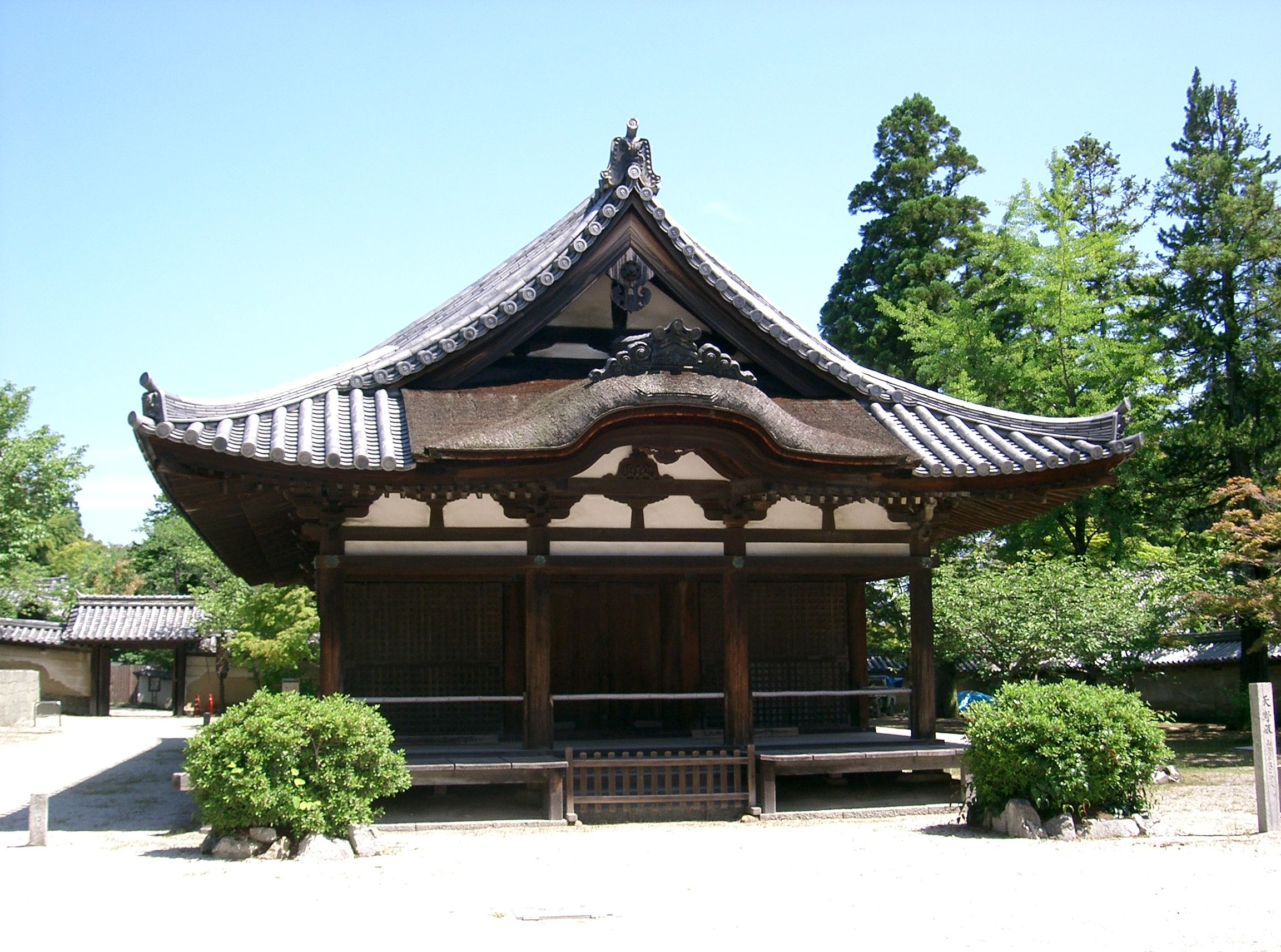
Refectory

Built between 1333 and 1392 as a seat for the administration, the refectory (Jiki-dō) (2) is also known as Amano-den (天野殿). It is a 7×3 ken structure with an irimoya-style hongawara type roof and a nokikarahafu gable; (Note: (nokikarahafu, 軒唐破風): an undulating Karahafu gable at eave ends) over the entrance in the gable end.

The temple's main hall (3) is the 7×7 ken Kon-dō, with a one ken step canopy and an irimoya-style roof of the hongawara type. Built in 1320 it houses the temple's main object of worship: Dainichi Nyorai flanked by Fudō Myōō and Trailokyavijaya. The group of three sculptures has been designated as National Treasure.

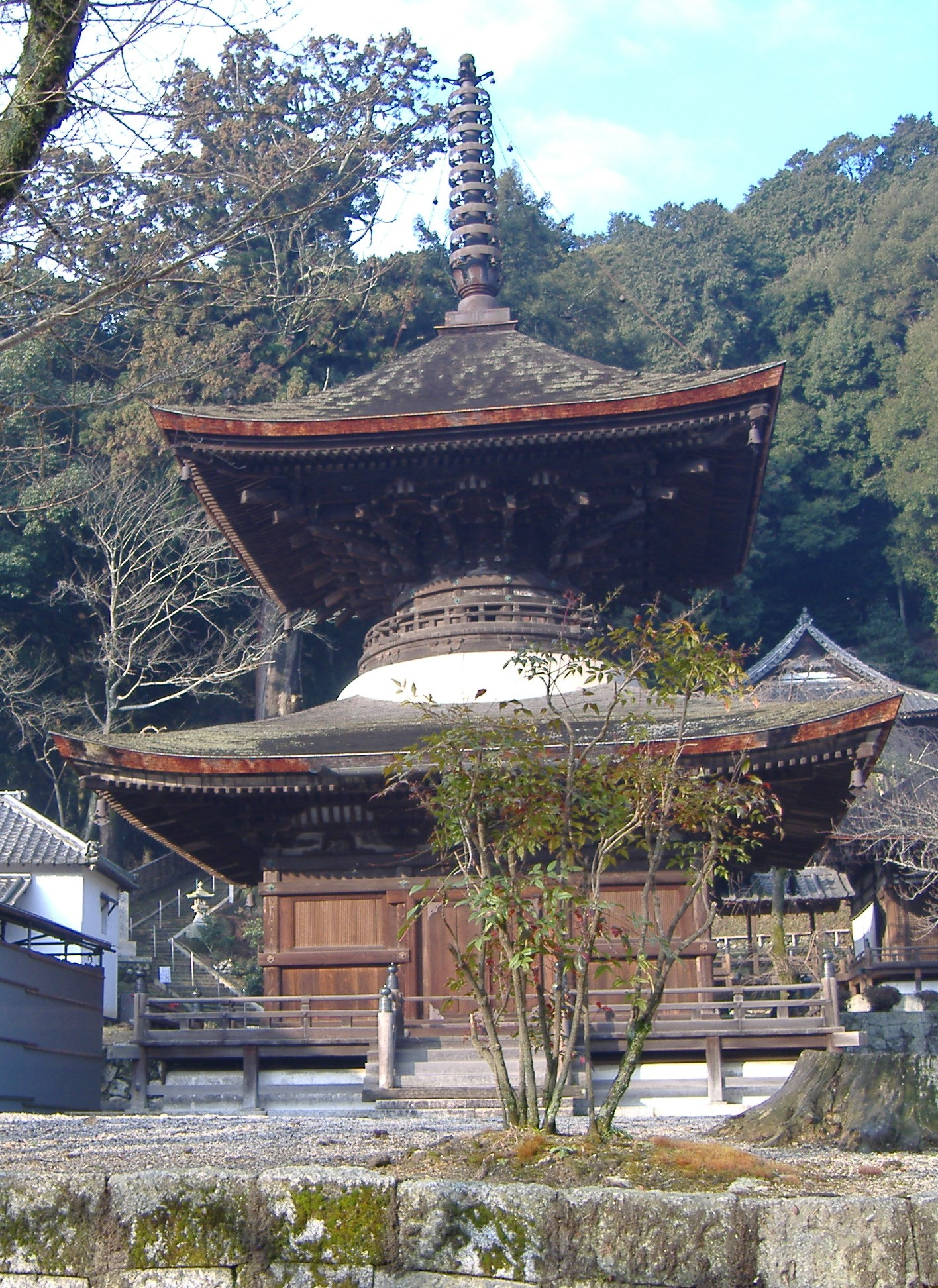
tahōtō

In front of the main hall, there is a 3 ken treasure pagoda (tahōtō) (4). Originally built during the Heian period, 1086–1184, it is the temple's oldest structure, although it has been restored considerably in 1606–1607. It is roofed in cedar wood shingles. The 3×2 ken bell tower, or shōrō behind the main hall dates to the Kamakura period. It has a flared skirt like lower part (袴腰, hakamagoshi) and an irimoya style hongawarabuki roof.

All of the structures mentioned so far have been designated as Important Cultural Properties.

Other buildings on the western end of the precinct are (from north to south), the Mie Hall (御影堂, Mie-dō) (6), the Hall of the Five Buddhas (五仏堂, Gobutsu-dō) (7) and the Yakushi Hall (薬師堂, Yakushi-dō) (8). All of these three structures have a square layout and a hip roof.

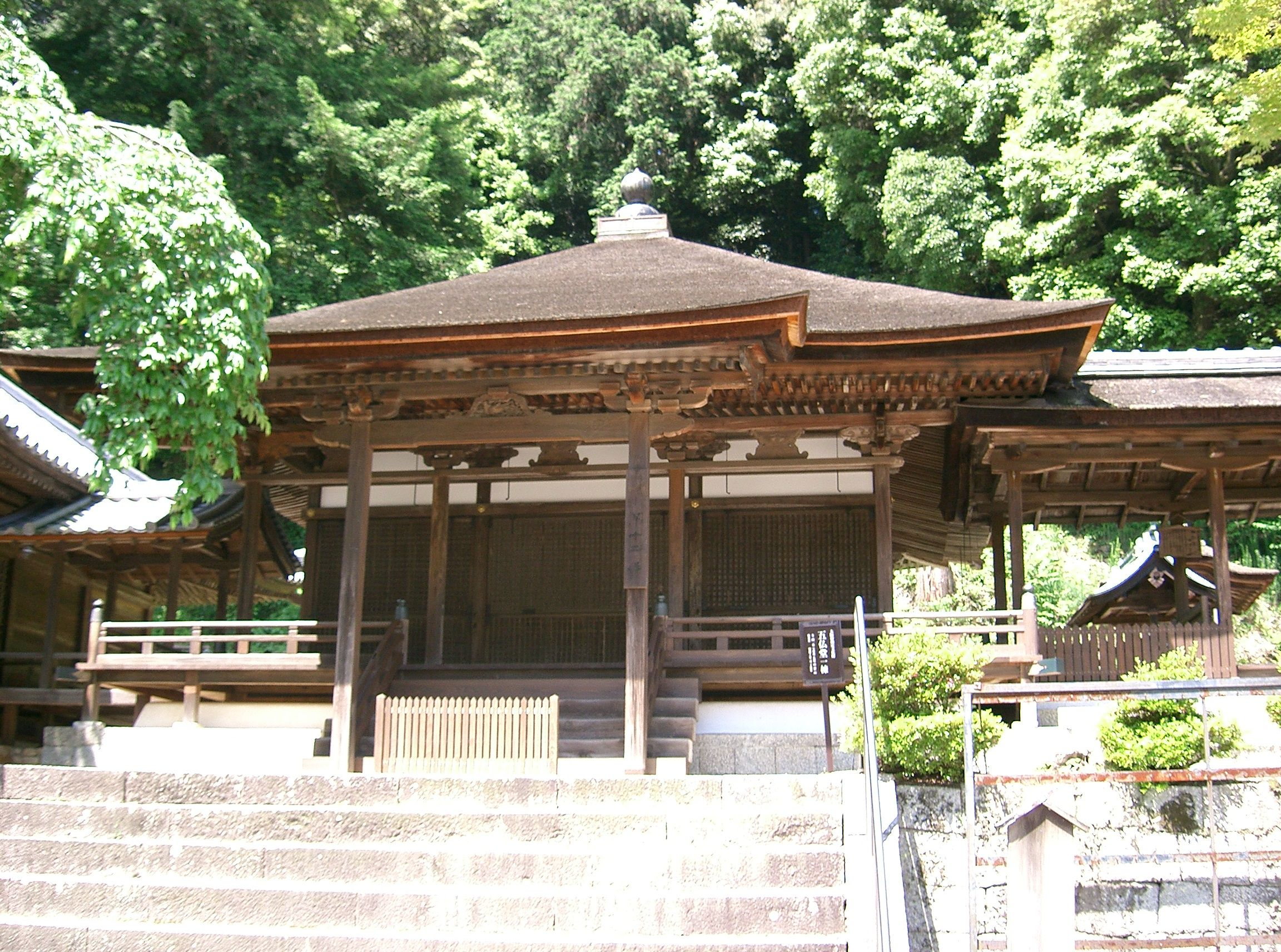
Gobutsu Hall

Most notable among them is the Mie Hall, an Important Cultural Property rebuilt in 1606. It is a 4×4 structure with tented roof covered with hinoki cypress shingles, a 1 ken step canopy at the front and a 2 ken step canopy at the back. There is a moon viewing stage under a karahafu gable attached to the eastern side of the hall, while the west is connected to the image hall.

== Cultural assets ==
The temple houses a large number of cultural properties among which the most valuable have been designated as five National Treasures and 29 Important Cultural Properties.

=== National Treasures ===
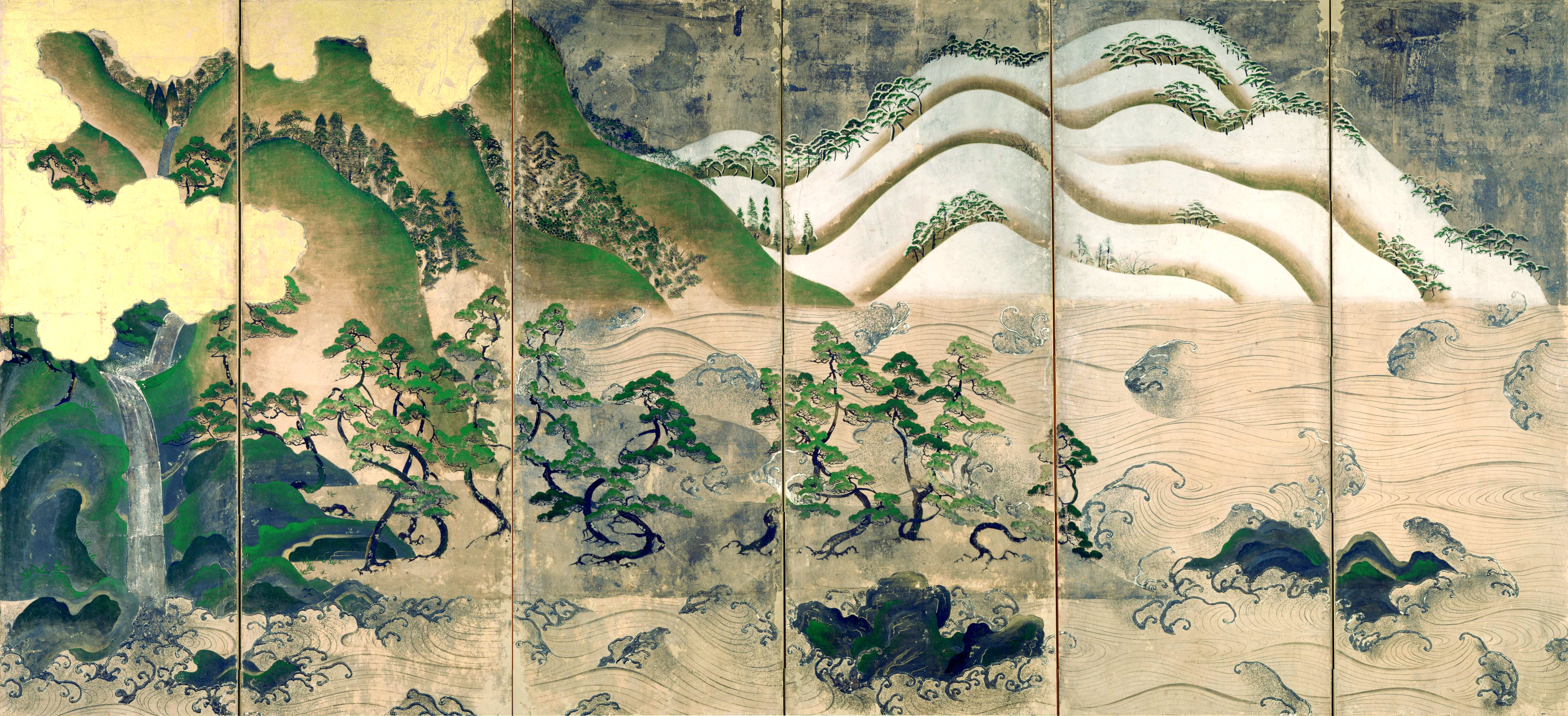

Landscape of the four seasons screens

Housed in the Kondō, the main sculptural group consists of seated statues of Dainichi Nyorai, Fudō Myōō and Trailokyavijaya and is partially a work of Gyōkai (行快), a disciple of Kaikei. The three sculptures were made of colored wood over a 50-year period with the Dainichi Nyorai dating to the late Heian period, c. 1180, and the Fudō Myōō from 1234, Kamakura period. They measure 313.5 cm (123.4 in) (Dainichi Nyorai), 201.7 cm (79.4 in) (Fudō Myōō) and 230.1 cm (90.6 in) (Trailokyavijaya) respectively. The groups appears in the Sonshō Mandala (尊勝曼荼羅) of Esoteric Buddhism. As a result of a large scale restoration and investigation in the Heisei period a writing in ink was found inside the womb of the statues, giving the date and author of Fudō Myōō. The group was subsequently, in 2017, designated as National Treasure.

The temple owns a pair of National Treasure mid-16th century Muromachi period, six-section folding screens (byōbu) known as Landscape of the four seasons (紙本著色日月四季山水図, shihon chakushoku jitsugetsu shiki sansui-zu). Drawn with ink and color on paper with gold leaf background, the screens measure 147.0 cm × 313.5 cm (57.9 in × 123.4 in) each. It is said that they were one of the utensils used in the esoteric kanjō (灌頂) ritual.

Now in custody at the Kyoto National Museum, one of few ancient jokotō swords has been transmitted at Kongō-ji. The blade is a straight double-edged unsigned tsurugi from the early Heian period. Its handle is in the shape of a Buddhist ritual implement, a pestle like weapon with three prongs (sanko). The sword was for ceremonial use and together with an accompanying black lacquer mounting from the Kamakura period has been designated as a National Treasure. The blade is 62.2 cm (24.5 in) long, 3.3 cm (1.3 in) wide and has a 11.1 cm (4.4 in) long tang.

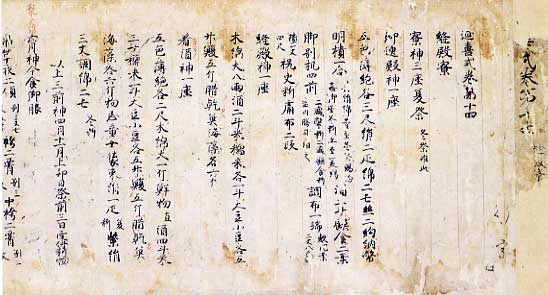
Engishiki, Kongō-ji edition

Two National Treasures of the Engishiki, a book about Japanese laws and customs compiled between 905 and 927, belong to the temple. Both are transcriptions from 1127, but as the original is lost, they represent the oldest extant copies of the work. One, known as the Kongō-ji edition, consists of three scrolls and contains volume 12 and fragments of volumes 14 and 16. The other is a single scroll of volumes 9 and 10 which contain a register of shrines in Japan.

=== Important Cultural Properties ===
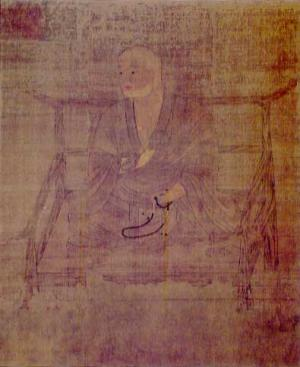
Kōbō Daishi

In addition to the six structures mentioned above, Kongō-ji holds a number of Important Cultural Properties in the arts and crafts category.

Paintings

- Kōbō-Daishi, color on silk, from the Heian period
- Kokūzō Bosatsu, color on silk, Kamakura period
- Mandala of the Five Secrets (五秘密曼荼羅), color on silk, Kamakura period
- Sonshō Mandala (尊勝曼荼羅図), color on silk, Kamakura period

Sculpture

- an Asuka period bronze standing image of Kannon Bosatsu, now in custody at the Nara National Museum
- Heian period wooden seated images of the Five Great Buddhas enshrined in the Gobutsu-dō
- an early Kamakura period wooden seated image of Dainichi Nyorai on a lotos pedestal and a halo with 37 kebutsu (化仏), manifestations of nyorai in another body. The sculpture dates to between 1172 and 1192 and is enshrined in the tahōtō. It measures 80.4 cm (31.7 in) with its halo is 116.5 cm (45.9 in) high.
- a pair of Kamakura period wooden standing nitennō located inside the rōmon, dated to 1279.

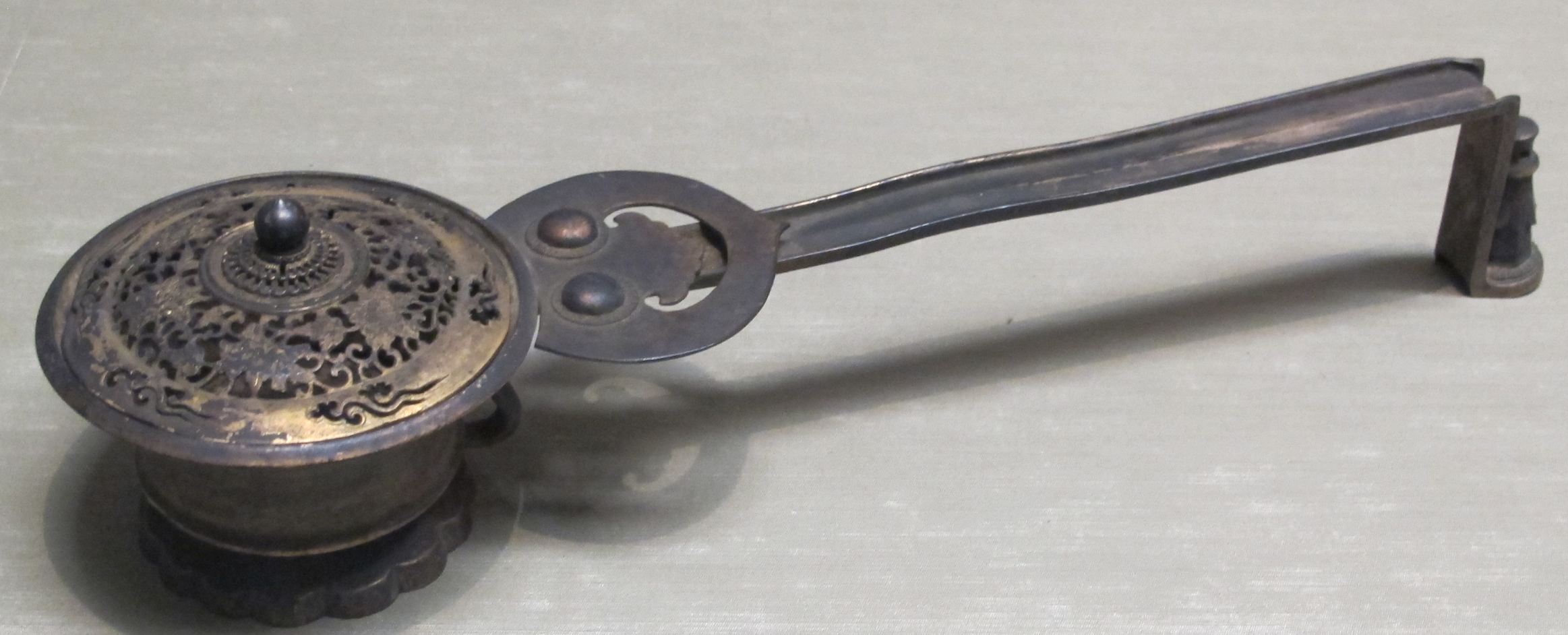
Censer

Crafts

- a Kamakura period censer or incense burner made by gilted copper casting, measuring 36.0 cm (14.2 in) (total length), with a handle width of 2.1 cm (0.83 in) and a container measuring 8.1 cm (3.2 in) (height) by 10.3 cm (4.1 in) (diameter). The lid is thought to be a later addition and has a design with Japanese morning glory. The censer is in custody at the Tokyo National Museum.
- a Kamakura period lacquered wooden box with gilt bronze fittings from 1320, now in custody at the Nara National Museum. The box measures 36.3 cm × 12.7 cm × 14.0 cm (14.3 in × 5.0 in × 5.5 in) and was used for ordination documents.
- a Heian period small lacquer box, now in custody at the Kyoto National Museum. The box measures 27.4 cm × 41.2 cm × 19.0 cm (10.8 in × 16.2 in × 7.5 in) and is covered in lacquer with a design of sparrows in the field in makie-e technique. The inside is decorated with branches and plum blossoms.

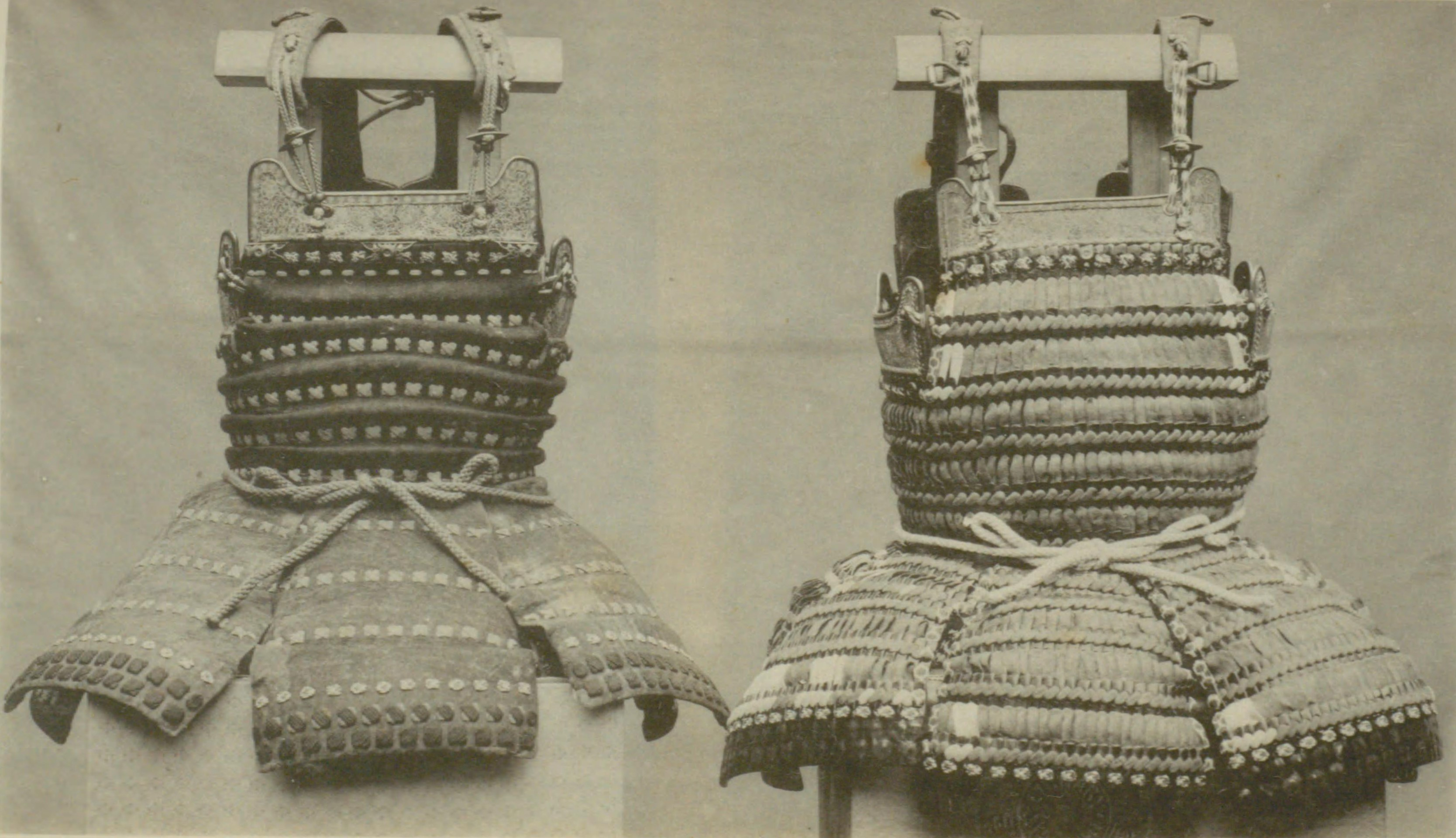
Two haramaki armours

- a set of haramaki and hizayoroi armour from the Muromachi and Nanboku-chō periods
- a Kamakura period cupronickel mirror with flowers and birds design
- a Kamakura period three-legged butterfly-shaped table with lotus arabesque, raden inlay and a semi-circular desk board. Made of lacquer covered wood with metal fittings. Height: 45.5 cm (17.9 in), desk: 38.5 cm × 21.3 cm (15.2 in × 8.4 in).
- a Heian period sutra box with lotus design in maki-e technique, now in custody at the Tokyo National Museum

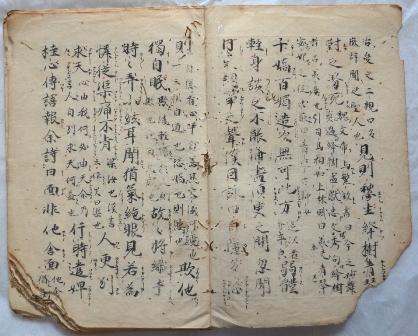
You Xian Ku

Written materials

- a Heian period scroll of volume 8 of the Lotus Sutra with gilt letters on deep blue paper from 1148 by Fujiwara no Motohira.
- one Heian period scroll of the Hōkyōin-darani sutra written with gold paint on deep blue paper
- 12 volumes of the Nirvana sutra from the Kamakura period each with a postscript by Emperor Murakami from 1359
- one scroll of the Hōkyōin-darani sutra from the Heian period
- one scroll from the Heian period on Fugen's practice and vows
- an excess copy of the Chinese 7th century novel You Xian Ku produced in 1320. This folding book measures 25.5 cm × 16.2 cm (10.0 in × 6.4 in) and is noted as the oldest existing manuscript from the late Kamakura period. The end contains a description of the kunyomi transmission in reading.

Ancient documents

- a letter in Kusunoki Masashige's own handwriting expressing the desire to help in the defense of Kongō-ji which was rumoured to be attacked by the Kamakura shogunate after the failed attempt to take rulership over from the bakufu.

== See also ==
- List of National Treasures of Japan (paintings)
- List of National Treasures of Japan (sculptures)
- List of National Treasures of Japan (crafts: swords)
- List of National Treasures of Japan (writings: Japanese books)
- List of Important Cultural Properties of Japan (Heian period: structures)
- List of Historic Sites of Japan (Osaka)
