= Moto-Hakone Stone Buddhas =

Group of Japanese Buddhist statues

- 元箱根石仏群 (Japanese)
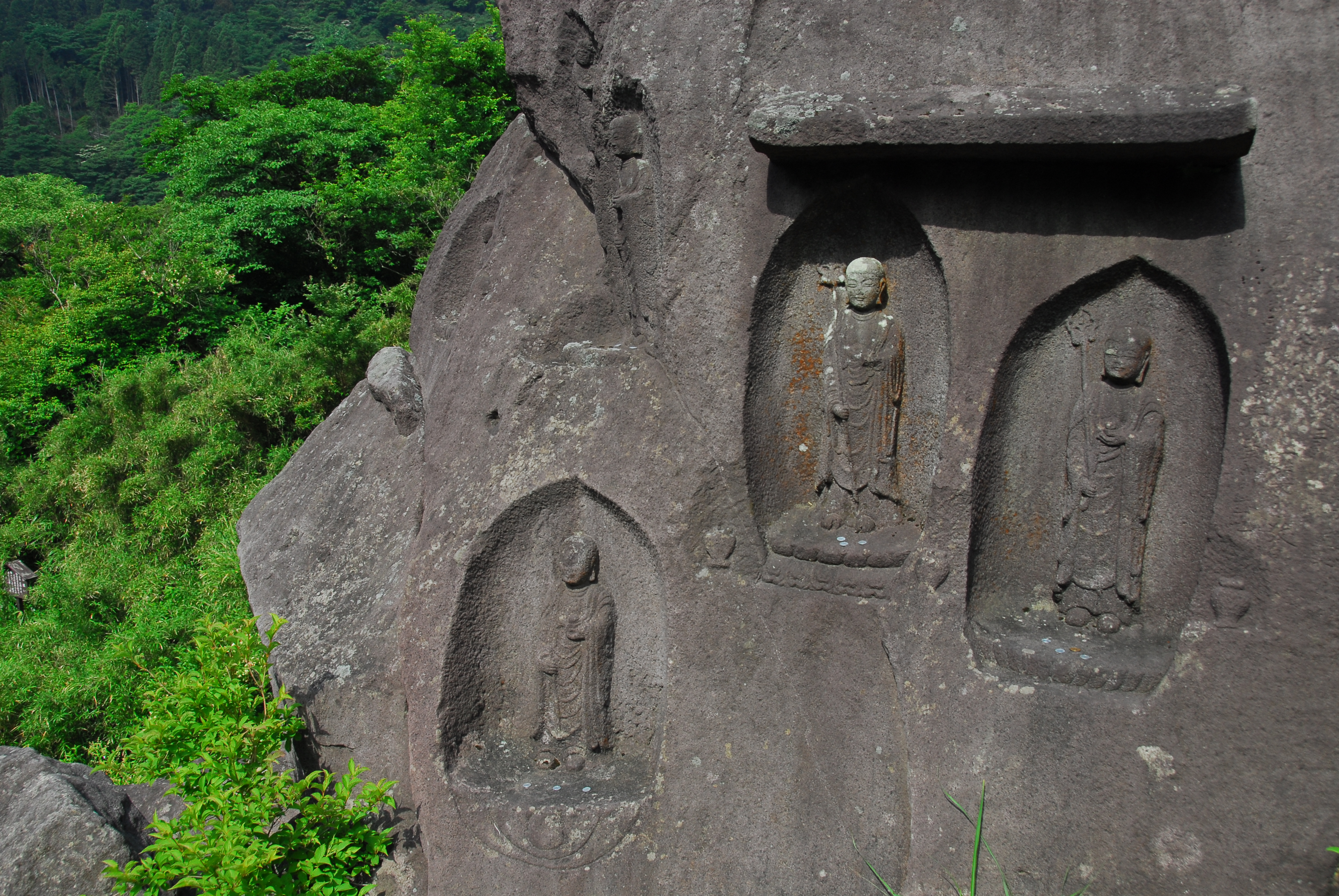
- Moto-Hakone Stone Buddhas

- Moto-Hakone Stone Buddhas Moto-Hakone Stone Buddhas (Japan)
- 35°12′50.7″N 139°2′11.5″E
- Type: Kofun
- Periods: Kamakura period
- Location: Hakone, Kanagawa Prefecture, Japan
- Region: Kantō region

History
- Built: 5th century AD

Site notes
- Public access: Yes

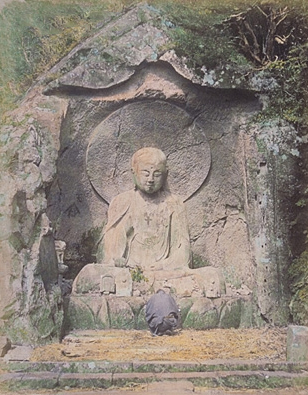
Rokudō Jizō; photograph by Adolfo Farsari

The Moto-Hakone Stone Buddhas (元箱根石仏群, Moto-Hakone sekibutsu) is a grouping of stone sculptures and associated tō (stone pagodas), dating from the late Kamakura period and located in the former village of Moto-Hakone, now merged into the town of Hakone in Kanagawa Prefecture, Japan. The group has been designated an National Historic Site and includes a number of Important Cultural Properties.

== Location ==
The stone Buddhas are located within Fuji-Hakone-Izu National Park, near Shōjin pond (精進池) in the valley between Mount Futago (二子山) (1091 m) and Mount Kami (神山) (1438 m). They are situated a little to the north of the old Tōkaidō; the modern Japan National Route 1 cuts the site into two. Kamakura-period travellers and the poet Asukai Masaari likened the volcanic area to Hell; consequently the site became popular for dedications to Jizō Bosatsu.

== Description ==
The stone sculptures comprise a 3.5 m seated Rokudō Jizō of 1299 (ICP); three Hitaki Jizō of 1311 (ICP), of which one measures 1.24 m and the other two are smaller; and twenty-five bosatsu (ICP), a group of twenty-six sculptures split into two by the road, of which twenty-four have been identified as Jizō and the twenty-sixth as Amida Nyorai, which measure between twenty centimetres and one metre, and which date between 1293 and 1313.

=== Rokudō Jizō ===
The main Rokudō Jizō is located on the east side of National Highway No. 1 from Seishin Pond. It is a sitting statue made of andesite and is protected by a cover. There is an inscription of the first year of Shoan (1299) on the rock surface on the left when facing the statue. As with the other statues, this image is a bas-relief, but is carved close to a sculpture in the round. Its left hand holds a jewel in front of the knee. The right hand is a later addition made during a repair, and the initial form is unknown.

=== Hitaki Jizō ===
The Hitaki Jizō is carved on cliff near Seishin Pond on the west side of National Highway No. 1. The principal image is on the left with inscriptions on the left and right of the statue. On the right side, are two more Jizō Bosatsu carvings, which replicate the main image on a slightly smaller scale. Nearby is a hōkyōintō remnant, commonly known as the grave of the Happyaku Bikuni, which is inscribed Kannō 1 (1350).

=== Hōkyōintō ===
Another stone hōkyōintō, which is said in popular legend to be the tomb of Minamoto no Mitsunaka, stands in the direction of Ashinoyu from the Hitaki Jizō. It depicts the Buddhas of the Womb Realm on three sides and has a bas-relief Buddha image on the fourth. There is an inscription with the dates of fifth month of Einin 4 (1296) and the eighth month of Shōan 2 (1300), and the name of a stone worker from Yamato Province and Ninshō, the head priest of Gokuraku-ji in Kamakura. This stone tower is a National ICP.

=== Twenty-five Bodhisattvas ===
A total of 26 bas-relief bodhisattva images are located in the direction of Ashi no Yu from the Hōkyōintō. Twenty-three bodies are carved on the east, south, and west sides of an andesite rock mass on the west side of National Highway No. 1, and three are carved on the rocks on the east side of the highway. "Twenty-five Bodhisattva" usually refers to a grouping of 25 Bodhisattva including Kannon Bosatsu and Seishi Bosatsu, who accompany Amida Nyorai; however this group is composed of one unidentifiable bodhisattva and 24 images of Jizō Bosatsu, along with one Amida Nyorai image. The image of Amida Nyorai is the largest of the grouping at about 98 centimeters.

=== Gorintō ===
In addition to the stone sculptures, there are three gorintō which date to the late Kamakura period, located further west of the Twenty-five Bodhisattvas grouping. Two of these are known in popular folklore as the graves of the Soga Brothers, the hero of the epic revenge story called the Soga Monogatari; A third, with an inscription dating it to the twelfth month of Einin 3 (1295), marks the grave of Tora Gozen (虎御前).

== See also ==
- List of Historic Sites of Japan (Kanagawa)
- ICP structures of the late Kamakura period
