= List of important cultural properties of Japan (Kamakura period: structures) =

This list contains Japanese structures dating from the Kamakura period (1185–1333) that have been designated important cultural properties. Asterisk (*) denotes a national treasure.

== Structures ==
=== Early Kamakura period ===
91 properties with 97 component structures.

Structure	Date	Municipality	Prefecture	Comments	Image	Coordinates	Ref.
Kumano Jinja Nagatoko 熊野神社長床; Kumano Jinja Nagatoko	1185–1274	Kitakata	Fukushima			37°37′08″N 139°49′50″E	
Former Jūrin-in Treasure House 旧十輪院宝蔵; Kyū-Jūrinin hōzō	1185–1274	Taitō	Tokyo	relocated from Nara to the Tokyo National Museum		35°43′08″N 139°46′29″E	
Gorintō 五輪塔; Gorintō	1244	Zushi	Kanagawa	property of Tōshō-ji (東昌寺)		35°18′18″N 139°35′35″E	
*Myōtsū-ji Three-Storey Pagoda 明通寺三重塔; Myōtsūji sanjūnotō	1270	Obama	Fukui			35°27′12″N 135°48′15″E	
*Myōtsū-ji Hondō 明通寺本堂; Myōtsūji hondō	1258	Obama	Fukui			35°27′13″N 135°48′16″E	
Miniature Shrine inside Shakuson-ji Kannondō 釈尊寺観音堂宮殿; Shakusonji Kannondō kūden	1258	Komoro	Nagano			36°19′49″N 138°23′09″E	
Chūzen-ji Yakushidō 中禅寺薬師堂; Chūzenji Yakushidō	1185–1274	Ueda	Nagano			36°20′10″N 138°11′08″E	
Miniature Shrine inside Kanpuku-ji Hondō 観福寺本堂内宮殿; Kanpukuji hondō nai kūden	1248	Tōkai	Aichi			35°00′46″N 136°53′53″E	
Stone Five-Storey Pagoda 五重塔 gojūnotō	1246	Ōmihachiman	Shiga			35°05′53″N 136°04′29″E	
Matsuō-ji Stone Nine-Storey Pagoda 松尾寺九重塔; Matsuōji kyūjūnotō	1270	Maibara	Shiga			35°18′23″N 136°20′10″E	
*Saimyō-ji Hondō 西明寺本堂; Saimyōji hondō	1185–1274	Kora	Shiga			35°11′00″N 136°17′07″E	
*Ishiyama-dera Tahōtō 石山寺多宝塔; Ishiyamadera tahōtō	1194	Ōtsu	Shiga			34°57′39″N 135°54′21″E	
Stone Tahōtō 多宝塔 tahōtō	1241	Konan	Shiga			35°01′39″N 136°03′23″E	
Ōno Jinja Rōmon 大野神社楼門; Ōno Jinja rōmon	1185–1274	Rittō	Shiga			34°59′24″N 136°01′22″E	
Chōan-ji Treasure Tower 長安寺宝塔; Chōanji hōtō	1185–1274	Ōtsu	Shiga			35°00′17″N 135°51′35″E	
*Chōju-ji Hondō 長寿寺本堂; Chōjuji hondō	1185–1274	Konan	Shiga			34°59′07″N 136°03′36″E	
Enkō-ji Stone Nine-Storey Pagoda 圓光寺九重塔; Enkōji kyūjūnotō	1256–1257	Yasu	Shiga			35°04′24″N 136°01′33″E	
Enkō-ji Hondō 圓光寺本堂; Enkōji hondō	1257	Yasu	Shiga			35°04′25″N 136°01′33″E	
Iin-ji Hōkyōintō 為因寺宝篋印塔; Iinji hōkyōintō	1265	Kyoto	Kyoto			35°02′50″N 135°40′53″E	
*Ujigami Jinja Haiden 宇治上神社拝殿; Ujigami Jinja haiden	1185–1274	Uji	Kyoto			34°53′31″N 135°48′41″E	
*Kaijūsen-ji Five-Storey Pagoda 海住山寺五重塔; Kaijūsenji gojūnotō	1214	Kizugawa	Kyoto			34°46′36″N 135°51′43″E	
Kaijūsen-ji Monjudō 海住山寺文殊堂; Kaijūsenji Monjudō	1185–1274	Kizugawa	Kyoto			34°46′37″N 135°51′43″E	
Tō-ji Keigamon 教王護国寺慶賀門; Kyōōgokokuji Keigamon	1185–1274	Kyoto	Kyoto			34°58′55″N 135°44′57″E	
Tō-ji Miniature Five-Storey Pagoda 教王護国寺五重小塔; Kyōōgokokuji gojūnotō	1240	Kyoto	Kyoto	discovered during repair work in 1955		34°58′52″N 135°44′48″E	
Tō-ji North Sōmon 教王護国寺北総門; Kyōōgokokuji kita sōmon	1185–1274	Kyoto	Kyoto			34°59′03″N 135°44′52″E	
*Tō-ji Rengemon 教王護国寺蓮花門; Kyōōgokokuji rengemon	1185–1274	Kyoto	Kyoto			34°58′50″N 135°44′47″E	
Tō-ji Kanjōin East Gate 教王護国寺灌頂院 (東門); Kyōōgokokuji kanjōin higashi mon	1185–1274	Kyoto	Kyoto			34°58′47″N 135°44′49″E	
Tō-ji Kanjōin North Gate 教王護国寺灌頂院 (北門); Kyōōgokokuji kanjōin kita mon	1185–1274	Kyoto	Kyoto			34°58′48″N 135°44′48″E	
*Kōmyō-ji Niōmon 光明寺二王門; Kōmyōji niōmon	1248	Ayabe	Kyoto			35°23′15″N 135°26′32″E	
*Kōryū-ji Keikyū-in Hondō 広隆寺桂宮院本堂; Kōryūji Keikyūin hondō	1251	Kyoto	Kyoto			35°00′54″N 135°42′19″E	
*Kōzan-ji Sekisui-in 高山寺石水院 (五所堂); Kōzanji Sekisuiin goshodō	1185–1274	Kyoto	Kyoto			35°03′36″N 135°40′43″E	
Sennyū-ji Founders Hall 泉涌寺開山堂; Sennyūji kaisandō	1185–1274	Kyoto	Kyoto			34°58′38″N 135°46′59″E	
*Daihōon-ji Hondō 大報恩寺本堂 (千本釈迦堂); Daihōonji hondō ("Senbon Shakadō")	1227	Kyoto	Kyoto			35°01′55″N 135°44′23″E	
Tōfuku-ji Rokuharamon 東福寺六波羅門; Tōfukuji rokuharamon	1185–1274	Kyoto	Kyoto			34°58′31″N 135°46′24″E	
Byōdō-in Kannondō 平等院観音堂; Byōdōin Kannondō	1185–1274	Uji	Kyoto			34°53′25″N 135°48′28″E	
*Hōkai-ji Amidadō 法界寺阿弥陀堂; Hōkaiji Amidadō	1185–1274	Kyoto	Kyoto			34°56′03″N 135°48′54″E	
Raigo-in Stone Three-Storey Pagoda 来迎院三重塔; Raigoin sanjūnotō	1185–1274	Kyoto	Kyoto			35°07′10″N 135°50′17″E	
*Sanjūsangendō 蓮華王院本堂 (三十三間堂); Rengeōin hondō (Sanjūsangendō)	1112	Kyoto	Kyoto			34°59′16″N 135°46′18″E	
Jigen-in Kondō 慈眼院金堂; Jigenin kondō	1275–1332	Izumisano	Osaka			34°22′27″N 135°20′37″E	
*Jigen-in Tahōtō 慈眼院多宝塔; Jigenin tahōtō	1271	Izumisano	Osaka			34°22′26″N 135°20′38″E	
Izuanashi Jinja Sessha Sumiyoshi Jinja Honden 泉穴師神社摂社住吉神社本殿; Izuanashi Jinja sessha Sumiyoshi Jinja honden	1273	Izumiōtsu	Osaka			34°29′48″N 135°25′11″E	
*Jōdo-ji Amidadō 浄土寺浄土堂(阿弥陀堂); Jōdoji Jōdodō (Amidadō)	1192	Ono	Hyōgo			34°51′51″N 134°57′40″E	
Nyōi-ji Amidadō 如意寺阿弥陀堂; Nyōiji Amidadō	1185–1274	Kobe	Hyōgo			34°41′58″N 135°01′09″E	
*Kōfuku-ji Three-Storey Pagoda 興福寺三重塔; Kōfukuji sanjūnotō	1185–1274	Nara	Nara			34°40′56″N 135°49′47″E	
*Kōfuku-ji Hokuendō 興福寺三重塔; Kōfukuji hokuendō	1210	Nara	Nara			34°41′00″N 135°49′47″E	
*Gangō-ji Gokurakubō Zen Room 元興寺極楽坊禅室; Gangōji gokurakubō zenshitsu	1185–1274	Nara	Nara			34°40′40″N 135°49′52″E	
*Gangō-ji Gokurakubō Hondō 元興寺極楽坊本堂; Gangōji gokurakubō hondō	1244	Nara	Nara			34°40′39″N 135°49′53″E	
Murō-ji Mirokudō 室生寺弥勒堂; Murōji Mirokudō	1185–1274	Uda	Nara			34°32′15″N 136°02′27″E	
Sōgen-ji Shikyakumon (Kangaku'in Omotemon) 宗源寺四脚門(勧学院表門); Sōgen-ji shikyakumon (Kangaku'in omotemon)	1237	Ikaruga	Nara			34°36′51″N 135°44′14″E	
*Akishino-dera Hondō 秋篠寺本堂; Akishino-dera hondō	1185–1274	Nara	Nara			34°42′13″N 135°44′14″E	
Jūrin-in Stone Buddha Niche 十輪院石仏龕; Jūrinin sekibutsu gan	1185–1274	Nara	Nara			34°40′35″N 135°50′00″E	
Jūrin-in South Gate 十輪院南門; Jūrinin nanmon	1185–1274	Nara	Nara			34°40′34″N 135°50′00″E	
*Jūrin-in Hondō 十輪院本堂; Jūrinin hondō	1185–1274	Nara	Nara			34°40′35″N 135°50′00″E	
Shinyakushi-ji Belfry 新薬師寺鐘楼; Shinyakushiji shōrō	1185–1274	Nara	Nara			34°40′32″N 135°50′47″E	
Shinyakushi-ji Jizōdō 新薬師寺地蔵堂; Shinyakushiji Jizōdō	1266	Nara	Nara			34°40′32″N 135°50′46″E	
Shinyakushi-ji East Gate 新薬師寺東門; Shinyakushiji higashi mon	1185–1274	Nara	Nara			34°40′33″N 135°50′47″E	
*Isonokami Jingū Haiden 石上神宮拝殿; Isonokami Jingū haiden	1185–1274	Tenri	Nara			34°35′52″N 135°51′07″E	
*Tōshōdai-ji Korō 唐招提寺鼓楼; Tōshōdaiji korō	1240	Nara	Nara			34°40′33″N 135°47′06″E	
Tōshōdai-ji Raidō 唐招提寺礼堂; Tōshōdaiji raidō	1202	Nara	Nara			34°40′33″N 135°47′07″E	
*Tōdai-ji Founders Hall 東大寺開山堂; Tōdaiji kaisandō	1200, 1250	Nara	Nara			34°41′20″N 135°50′36″E	
Tōdai-ji Gorintō 東大寺五輪塔; Tōdaiji gorintō	1185–1274	Nara	Nara			34°41′15″N 135°50′17″E	
*Tōdai-ji Belfry 東大寺鐘楼; Tōdaiji shōrō	1207–1210	Nara	Nara			34°41′19″N 135°50′31″E	
*Tōdai-ji Nandaimon 東大寺南大門; Tōdaiji nandaimon	1199	Nara	Nara			34°41′09″N 135°50′24″E	
Tōdai-ji Nigatsudō Busshōya 東大寺二月堂仏餉屋(御供所); Tōdaiji Nigatsudō Busshōya (gokūsho)	1185–1274	Nara	Nara	for preparation of ritual food offerings		34°41′21″N 135°50′37″E	
Tōdai-ji Nenbutsudō 東大寺念仏堂; Tōdaiji Nenbutsudō	1237	Nara	Nara			34°41′19″N 135°50′33″E	
Tōdai-ji Hokkedō North Gate 東大寺法華堂北門; Tōdaiji Hokkedō kitamon	1240	Nara	Nara			34°41′21″N 135°50′39″E	
Hannya-ji Stone Thirteen-Storey Pagoda 般若寺十三重塔; Hannyaji jūsanjūnotō	1253	Nara	Nara			34°41′59″N 135°50′10″E	
Hannya-ji Rōmon 般若寺楼門; Hannyaji rōmon	1264–1274	Nara	Nara			34°41′59″N 135°50′08″E	
Fukuchi-in Hondō 福智院本堂; Fukuchiin hondō	1203	Nara	Nara			34°40′37″N 135°50′04″E	
Hōkyōintō 宝篋印塔 hōkyōintō	1259	Ikaruga	Nara			34°40′07″N 135°42′12″E	
*Hōryū-ji Sangyōin and Nishimuro 法隆寺三経院及び西室; Hōryūji sangyōin oyobi nishimuro	1231	Ikaruga	Nara			34°36′51″N 135°44′00″E	
Hōryū-ji Refectory and Hosodono 法隆寺食堂及び細殿; Hōryūji jikidō oyobi hosodono	1268	Ikaruga	Nara	(see also Nara-period ICPs)		34°36′53″N 135°44′08″E	
*Hōryū-ji Saiendō 法隆寺西円堂; Hōryūji saiendō	1250	Ikaruga	Nara			34°36′53″N 135°43′59″E	
Hōryū-ji Tōin East Corridor 法隆寺東院廻廊 東廻廊; Hōryūji tōin higashi kairō	1237	Ikaruga	Nara			34°36′52″N 135°44′21″E	
Hōryū-ji Tōin West Corridor 法隆寺東院廻廊 西廻廊; Hōryūji tōin nishi kairō	1237	Ikaruga	Nara			34°36′52″N 135°44′19″E	
Hōryū-ji Tōin Shikyakumon 法隆寺東院四脚門; Hōryūji tōin shikyakumon	1185–1274	Ikaruga	Nara			34°36′51″N 135°44′19″E	
Hōryū-ji Tōin Shariden and Eden 法隆寺東院舎利殿及び絵殿; Hōryūji tōin shariden oyobi eden	1219	Ikaruga	Nara			34°36′52″N 135°44′20″E	
*Hōryū-ji Tōin Belfry 法隆寺東院鐘楼; Hōryūji tōin shōrō	1185–1274	Ikaruga	Nara			34°36′53″N 135°44′19″E	
Hōryū-ji Tōin Raidō 法隆寺東院礼堂; Hōryūji tōin raidō	1231	Ikaruga	Nara			34°36′51″N 135°44′20″E	
*Enjō-ji Kasugadō 圓成寺 春日堂; Enjōji Kasugadō	1227–8	Nara	Nara	pictured on left		34°41′45″N 135°54′56″E	
*Enjō-ji Hakusandō 圓成寺 白山堂; Enjōji Hakusandō	1227–8	Nara	Nara	pictured on right		34°41′45″N 135°54′56″E	
Taima-dera Kondō 當麻寺金堂; Taimadera kondō	before 1268	Katsuragi	Nara			34°30′57″N 135°41′42″E	
Kongōsanmai-in Sutra Repository 金剛三昧院経蔵; Kongōsanmaiin kyōzō	1222–3	Kōya	Wakayama			34°12′35″N 135°35′13″E	
Kongōsanmai-in Tahōtō 金剛三昧院多宝塔; Kongōsanmaiin tahōtō	1223	Kōya	Wakayama			34°12′35″N 135°35′14″E	
*Kongōbu-ji Fudōdō 金剛峯寺不動堂; Kongōbuji Fudōdō	1275–1332	Kōya	Wakayama			34°12′47″N 135°34′50″E	
Goryūsonryū-in Hōtō 五流尊滝院宝塔; Goryūsonryū-in hōtō	1240	Kurashiki	Okayama			34°32′24″N 133°49′13″E	
*Itsukushima Jinja Heiden and Haiden 厳島神社幣殿、拝殿; Itsukushima Jinja heiden, haiden	1241	Hatsukaichi	Hiroshima			34°17′45″N 132°19′12″E	
*Itsukushima Jinja Haraiden 厳島神社本社祓殿; Itsukushima Jinja Haraiden	1241	Hatsukaichi	Hiroshima			34°17′45″N 132°19′12″E	
*Itsukushima Jinja Sessha Marōdo Jinja Honden, Heiden, and Haiden 摂社客神社本殿、幣殿、拝殿 sessha Marōdo Jinja honden, heiden, haiden	1241	Hatsukaichi	Hiroshima			34°17′45″N 132°19′12″E	
*Itsukushima Jinja Sessha Marōdo Jinja Haraedono 摂社客神社祓殿 sessha Marōdo Jinja haraedono	1241	Hatsukaichi	Hiroshima			34°17′45″N 132°19′12″E	
*Kandani Jinja Honden 神谷神社本殿; Kandani Jinja honden	1219	Sakaide	Kagawa			34°19′29″N 133°55′00″E	
*Taihō-ji Hondō 大宝寺本堂; Taihōji hondō	1185–1274	Matsuyama	Ehime			33°50′30″N 132°44′32″E	
Stone Thirteen-Storey Pagoda 十三重塔 jūsanjūnotō	1230	Yatsushiro	Kumamoto			32°29′21″N 130°35′58″E	
Myōdō-ji Amidadō 明導寺阿弥陀堂; Myōdōji Amidadō	1229	Yunomae	Kumamoto			32°15′09″N 130°58′27″E	
Myōdō-ji Stone Nine-Storey Pagoda 明導寺九重石塔; Myōdōji kyūjūsekitō	1230	Yunomae	Kumamoto			32°15′10″N 130°58′28″E	
Myōdō-ji Stone Seven-Storey Pagoda 明導寺七重石塔; Myōdōji shichijūsekitō	1230	Yunomae	Kumamoto			32°15′10″N 130°58′28″E	
Stone Nine-Storey Pagoda 九重塔 kyūjūnotō	1267	Usuki	Ōita			33°01′48″N 131°43′00″E	

=== Late Kamakura period ===
196 properties

Structure	Date	Municipality	Prefecture	Comments	Image	Coordinates	Ref.
Eryū-ji Kannondō 恵隆寺観音堂; Eryūji Kannondō	1275–1332	Aizubange	Fukushima			37°34′29″N 139°47′58″E	
Kōan-ji Former Kannondō Miniature Shrine 弘安寺旧観音堂厨子; Kōanji kyū-Kannondō zushi	1275–1332	Aizumisato	Fukushima			37°30′08″N 139°49′22″E	
Hōyō-ji Hondō Miniature Shrine and Altar 法用寺本堂内厨子及び仏壇; Hōyōji hondō nai zushi oyobi butsudan	1314	Aizumisato	Fukushima			37°29′18″N 139°48′51″E	
Sairen-ji Sōrintō 西蓮寺相輪塔; Sairenji sōrintō	1287	Namegata	Ibaraki			36°04′18″N 140°26′18″E	
Banna-ji Belfry 鑁阿寺鐘楼; Bannaji shōrō	1275–1332	Ashikaga	Tochigi			36°20′13″N 139°27′09″E	
Banna-ji Hondō 鑁阿寺本堂; Bannaji hondō	1299	Ashikaga	Tochigi			36°20′15″N 139°27′08″E	
Chōraku-ji Treasure Tower 長楽寺宝塔; Chōrakuji hōtō	1276	Ōta	Gunma			36°15′46″N 139°16′30″E	
Kōfuku-ji Hōkyōintō 光福寺宝篋印塔; Kōfukuji hōkyōintō	1323	Higashimatsuyama	Saitama			36°05′21″N 139°24′20″E	
Fukutoku-ji Amidadō 福徳寺阿弥陀堂; Fukutokuji Amidadō	1275–1332	Hannō	Saitama			35°53′52″N 139°15′38″E	
An'yō-in Hōkyōintō 安養院宝篋印塔; An'yōin Hōkyōintō	1308	Kamakura	Kanagawa			35°18′52″N 139°33′19″E	
Egara Tenjin-sha Honden 荏柄天神社本殿; Egara Tenjinsha honden	1316	Kamakura	Kanagawa			35°19′33″N 139°33′52″E	
Kakuon-ji Kaisantō 覚園寺開山塔; Kakuonji kaisantō	1332	Kamakura	Kanagawa			35°20′00″N 139°33′49″E	
Kakuon-ji Daitōtō 覚園寺大燈塔; Kakuonji daitōtō	1332	Kamakura	Kanagawa			35°20′00″N 139°33′49″E	
Gokuraku-ji Gorintō 極楽寺五輪塔; Gokurakuji gorintō	1310	Kamakura	Kanagawa			35°18′39″N 139°31′33″E	
Gokuraku-ji Ninshōtō 極楽寺忍性塔; Gokurakuji ninshōtō	1275–1332	Kamakura	Kanagawa			35°18′37″N 139°31′33″E	
Kenchō-ji Zen Master Daikaku Tower 建長寺大覚禅師塔; Kenchōji Daikaku zenji tō	1275–1332	Kamakura	Kanagawa			35°19′51″N 139°33′19″E	
Gorintō 五輪塔 gorintō	1295	Hakone	Kanagawa			35°13′00″N 139°02′19″E	
Gorintō 五輪塔 gorintō	1275–1332	Hakone	Kanagawa			35°13′00″N 139°02′19″E	
Gorintō 五輪塔 gorintō	1275–1332	Hakone	Kanagawa			35°13′00″N 139°02′19″E	
Jōkōmyō-ji Gorintō 浄光明寺五輪塔; Jōkōmyōji gorintō	1306	Kamakura	Kanagawa			35°19′40″N 139°33′08″E	
Hōkyōintō 五輪塔 hōkyōintō	1296	Hakone	Kanagawa			35°12′55″N 139°02′10″E	
Jingū-ji Niōmon 神宮寺仁王門; Jingūji niōmon	1275–1332	Obama	Fukui			35°27′36″N 135°47′00″E	
Ōtani-ji Stone Nine-Storey Pagoda 大谷寺九重塔; Ōtaniji kujūnotō	1323	Echizen	Fukui			36°00′23″N 136°05′24″E	
Kannondō 観音堂 kannondō	1275–1332	Kosuge	Yamanashi			35°43′26″N 138°59′17″E	
*Daizen-ji Hondō 大善寺本堂; Daizenji hondō	1286	Kōshū	Yamanashi			35°39′26″N 138°44′35″E	
*Anraku-ji Octagonal Three-Storey Pagoda 安楽寺八角三重塔; Anrakuji hakkaku sanjūnotō	1275–1332	Ueda	Nagano			36°21′09″N 138°09′08″E	
Jōraku-ji Stone Tahōtō 常楽寺多宝塔; Jōrakuji tahōtō	1275–1332	Ueda	Nagano			36°21′13″N 138°09′15″E	
Bunei-ji Stone Chamber 文永寺石室; Buneiji sekishitsu	1283	Iida	Nagano			35°28′15″N 137°50′40″E	
Bunei-ji Gorintō 文永寺五輪塔; Buneiji gorintō	1283	Iida	Nagano			35°28′15″N 137°50′40″E	
Hōkyōintō 宝篋印塔 hōkyōintō	1317	Azumino	Nagano			35°18′33″N 139°31′36″E	
Hōkyōintō 宝篋印塔 hōkyōintō	1317	Azumino	Nagano			35°18′33″N 139°31′36″E	
Enkyō-ji Rōmon 円鏡寺楼門; Enkyōji rōmon	1293	Kitagata	Gifu			35°26′11″N 136°41′18″E	
Nichiryūbu-ji Tahōtō 日竜峯寺多宝塔; Nichiryūbuji tahōtō	1275–1332	Seki	Gifu			35°33′26″N 136°59′31″E	
*Konren-ji Amidadō 金蓮寺弥陀堂; Konrenji Midadō	1275–1332	Nishio	Aichi			34°48′32″N 137°04′22″E	
Jimoku-ji Nandaimon 甚目寺南大門; Jimokuji nandaimon	1275–1332	Ama	Aichi			35°11′39″N 136°49′23″E	
Shōkai-ji Treasure Tower 性海寺 宝塔; Shōkaiji hōtō	1281	Inazawa	Aichi			35°14′24″N 136°47′35″E	
Myōgen-ji Yanagidō 妙源寺柳堂; Myōgenji yanagidō	1314	Okazaki	Aichi			34°56′54″N 137°07′27″E	
Kunitsu Jinja Stone Thirteen-Storey Pagoda 国津神社十三重塔; Kunitsu Jinja jūsanjūnotō	1275–1332	Tsu	Mie			34°32′14″N 136°11′36″E	
Anyō-ji Stone Thirteen-Storey Pagoda 安養寺十三重塔; Anyōji jūsanjūnotō	1275–1332	Rittō	Shiga			35°01′09″N 135°59′51″E	
Kagami Jinja Hōkyōintō 鏡神社宝篋印塔; Kagami Jinja hōkyōintō	1275–1332	Ryūō	Shiga			35°05′05″N 136°04′42″E	
Treasure Tower 懸所宝塔 kakesho hōtō	1275–1332	Moriyama	Shiga			35°03′25″N 135°58′44″E	
Mikami Jinja Sessha Wakamiya Jinja Honden 御上神社摂社若宮神社本殿; Mikami Jinja sessha Wakamiya Jinja honden	1275–1332	Yasu	Shiga			35°03′00″N 136°01′38″E	
Mikami Jinja Haiden 御上神社拝殿; Mikami Jinja haiden	1275–1332	Yasu	Shiga			35°02′59″N 136°01′39″E	
*Mikami Jinja Honden 御上神社本殿; Mikami Jinja honden	1275–1332	Yasu	Shiga			35°03′00″N 136°01′39″E	
Mikami Jinja Rōmon 御上神社楼門; Mikami Jinja rōmon	1275–1332	Yasu	Shiga			35°02′59″N 136°01′39″E	
Saimyō-ji Stone Five-Storey Pagoda 最明寺五重塔; Saimyōji gojūnotō	1275–1332	Moriyama	Shiga			35°03′01″N 135°59′33″E	
Shina Jinja Honden 志那神社本殿; Shina jinja honden	1298	Kusatsu	Shiga			35°03′12″N 135°55′57″E	
Jakushō-ji Hōkyōintō 寂照寺宝篋印塔; Jakushō-ji hōkyōintō	1275–1332	Hino	Shiga			34°59′56″N 136°17′56″E	
Kasuga Jinja Honden 春日神社本殿; Kasuga Jinja honden	1319	Ōtsu	Shiga			34°54′20″N 135°56′55″E	
Shōhō-ji Treasure Tower 正法寺宝塔; Shōhō-ji hōtō	1315	Hino	Shiga			34°59′03″N 136°15′55″E	
Ikuwa Jinja Massha Kasuga Jinja Honden 生和神社末社春日神社本殿; Ikuwa Jinja massha Kasuga Jinja honden	1275–1332	Yasu	Shiga			35°04′45″N 136°02′02″E	
*Saimyō-ji Three-Storey Pagoda 西明寺三重塔; Saimyōji sanjūnotō	1275–1332	Kōra	Shiga			35°10′59″N 136°17′07″E	
Saimyō-ji Treasure Tower 西明寺宝塔; Saimyōji hōtō	1304	Kōra	Shiga			35°10′59″N 136°17′08″E	
Ishiyama-dera Belfry 石山寺鐘楼; Ishiyamadera shōrō	1275–1332	Ōtsu	Shiga			34°57′39″N 135°54′22″E	
Sekitō-ji Gorintō 石塔寺五輪塔; Sekitōji gorintō	1304	Higashiōmi	Shiga			35°04′12″N 136°12′27″E	
Sekitō-ji Gorintō 石塔寺五輪塔; Sekitōji gorintō	1349	Higashiōmi	Shiga			35°04′12″N 136°12′27″E	
Sekitō-ji Treasure Tower 石塔寺宝塔; Sekitōji hōtō	1302	Higashiōmi	Shiga			35°04′12″N 136°12′27″E	
Sekinin-ji Stone Seven-Storey Pagoda 赤人寺七重塔; Sekininji shichijūnotō	1318	Higashiōmi	Shiga			35°02′01″N 136°11′13″E	

== See also ==
- Cultural Properties of Japan
- Japanese Buddhist architecture
- List of Important Cultural Properties of Japan (Heian period: structures)
