= Butsuryū-ji =

Butsuryū-ji 仏隆寺
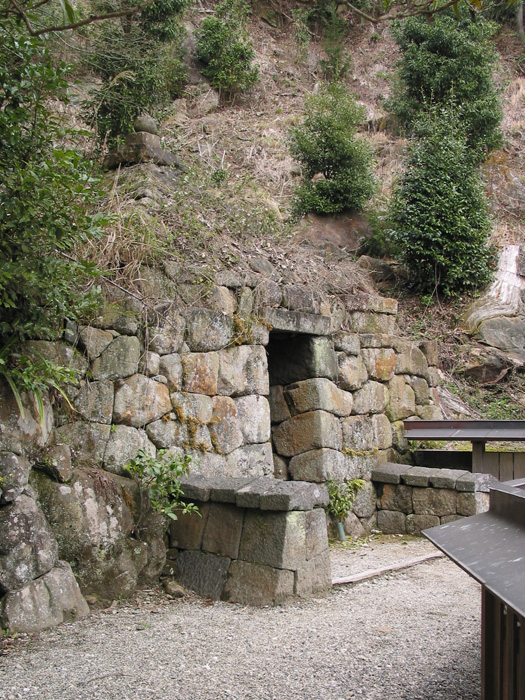
- Heian-period stone chamber at Butsuryū-ji (ICP)

Religion
- Affiliation: Shingon (Murō-ji branch)
- Deity: Jūichimen Kannon

Location
- Location: 1684 Haibara Akabane, Uda, Nara Prefecture
- Country: Japan
- Interactive map of Butsuryū-ji 仏隆寺
- Coordinates: 34°30′55″N 136°0′35″E

Architecture
- Founder: Kenne
- Completed: 850

Butsuryū-ji (仏隆寺 or 佛隆寺) is a ninth-century Shingon temple in Uda, Nara Prefecture, Japan. It is located approximately four kilometres southwest of Murō-ji across Mount Murō.

== History ==
According to an official letter dated to 946, Butsuryū-ji was founded in 850 by Kenne (堅恵), disciple of Kukai, under the patronage of Okitsugu; upon Kenne's death, Shinsei and Kanshin succeeded him. An inscription on the temple bell of 863 similarly celebrates the temple's foundation by Kenne. Only a fragment of the bell now survives, preserved at the temple; the inscription is known from copies, including a fourteenth-century version now housed at Kanazawa Bunko. A Map of Mount Murō (宀一山図) in the same collection, dating to 1314, locates Kenne's grave at the temple; it is generally identified with Butsuryū-ji's unusual stone chamber with pyramidal roof. Although the present buildings are more recent, a statue of Kenne still stands beside those of Kukai and Jūichimen Kannon on the altar.

Since both Butsuryū-ji and Murō-ji could be referred to as Mount Murō, it appears that the two were sometimes confused or conflated: an early eighteenth-century encyclopaedia refers to the former as Nyonin Kōya or "Kōyasan for Women", an appellation usually reserved for the latter, referring to the ban on female visitation, relaxed in 1872. A stone marker on the road to Butsuryū-ji still proclaims "Mount Murō Nyonin Kōya".

== Cultural Properties ==
- Stone chamber, dated to the ninth century or late Heian period (Important Cultural Property)
- Nine-hundred-year-old cherry tree (Prefectural Natural Monument)

There is also a thirteen-storey stone tō dating to 1330 and dedicated to Shũen, important figure in the early history of Murō-ji.

== See also ==
- List of Important Cultural Properties of Japan (Heian period: structures)
- Murō-Akame-Aoyama Quasi-National Park
