= List of important cultural properties of Japan (Heian period: structures) =

This list is of Japanese structures dating from the Heian period (794–1185) that have been designated important cultural properties (including *national treasures).

== Structures ==
=== Early Heian period ===
Seven surviving sites with the same number of component structures have been designated, including four National Treasures. Despite the transfer of the capital to Heian-kyō, due to losses in fires and wars, all are in Nara Prefecture, other than for a stone tō in Gunma Prefecture. Those at Tōdai-ji form part of the UNESCO World Heritage Site Historic Monuments of Ancient Nara; that at Hōryū-ji is part of the World Heritage Site Buddhist Monuments in the Hōryū-ji Area.

Structure	Date	Municipality	Prefecture	Comments	Image	Coordinates	Ref.
Tōba 塔婆 tōba	801	Kiryū	Gunma			36°25′44″N 139°13′14″E	
*Murō-ji Kondō 室生寺金堂; Murōji kondō	794-929	Uda	Nara			34°32′15″N 136°02′28″E	
*Murō-ji Five-Storey Pagoda 室生寺五重塔; Murōji gojūnotō	710-1184	Uda	Nara			34°32′18″N 136°02′25″E	
Tōdai-ji Kanjinsho Repository 東大寺勧進所経庫; Tōdaiji kanjinsho kyōko	794-929	Nara	Nara			34°41′19″N 135°50′14″E	
Tōdai-ji Hokkedō Repository 東大寺法華堂経庫; Tōdaiji Hokkedō kyōko	794-929	Nara	Nara			34°41′17″N 135°50′39″E	
*Hōryū-ji Kōfūzō 法隆寺綱封蔵; Hōryūji kōfūzō	794-929	Ikaruga	Nara			34°36′52″N 135°44′08″E	
*Taima-dera West Pagoda 當麻寺西塔; Taimadera saitō	794-929	Katsuragi	Nara			34°30′56″N 135°41′40″E	

=== Middle Heian period ===
Five surviving sites with eight component structures have been designated, all but one of them National Treasures. The Phoenix Hall at Byōdō-in is designated as a single site with four component structures. The five-storey pagoda at Daigo-ji is the earliest structure within the current borders of the city of Kyoto. Both form part of the World Heritage Site Historic Monuments of Ancient Kyoto (Kyoto, Uji and Otsu Cities).

Structure	Date	Municipality	Prefecture	Comments	Image	Coordinates	Ref.
*Daigo-ji Five-Storey Pagoda 醍醐寺五重塔; Daigōji gojūnotō	952	Kyoto	Kyoto			34°57′02″N 135°49′20″E	
*Byōdō-in Phoenix Hall (central hall) 平等院鳳凰堂 (中堂); Byōdōin hōōdō (chūdō)	1053	Uji	Kyoto			34°53′21″N 135°48′28″E	
*Byōdō-in Phoenix Hall (south wing corridor) 平等院鳳凰堂 (両翼廊 (南)); Byōdōin hōōdō (ryōyokurō (minami))	1053	Uji	Kyoto			34°53′22″N 135°48′28″E	
*Byōdō-in Phoenix Hall (north wing corridor) 平等院鳳凰堂 (両翼廊 (北)); Byōdōin hōōdō (ryōyokurō (kita))	1053	Uji	Kyoto			34°53′21″N 135°48′28″E	
*Byōdō-in Phoenix Hall (tail corridor) 平等院鳳凰堂 (尾廊); Byōdōin hōōdō (birō)	1053	Uji	Kyoto			34°53′21″N 135°48′27″E	
*Hōryū-ji Belfry 法隆寺鐘楼; Hōryūji shōrō	1005-1020	Ikaruga	Nara			34°36′53″N 135°44′04″E	
*Hōryū-ji Large Lecture Hall 法隆寺大講堂; Hōryūji daikōdō	990	Ikaruga	Nara			34°36′53″N 135°44′03″E	
Thousand Buddha Treasure Tower 多宝千仏石幢 tahō senbutsu sekitō	1084	Dazaifu	Fukuoka	at the Kyushu National Museum		33°31′06″N 130°32′19″E	

=== Late Heian period ===
Thirty-five surviving sites with thirty-six component structures have been designated, including fourteen National Treasures. The earliest structures, other than four stone tō, outside Nara and Kyoto Prefectures date from the second half of the eleventh century or early twelfth century. Those at Chūson-ji form part of the World Heritage Site Hiraizumi – Temples, Gardens and Archaeological Sites Representing the Buddhist Pure Land. Buraku-ji in Kōchi Prefecture, Shikoku, and Fuki-ji in Ōita Prefecture, Kyushu, contain the earliest wooden structures outside Honshu. The honden of Ujigami Jinja is the earliest wooden Shinto shrine building, while two stone examples from the city of Yamagata are the earliest torii.

Structure	Date	Municipality	Prefecture	Comments	Image	Coordinates	Ref.
Ganjōju-in Hōtō 願成就院宝塔; Ganjōjuin hōtō	1086-1184	Hiraizumi	Iwate			39°00′06″N 141°06′07″E	
Shaku-in Gorintō 釈尊院五輪塔; Shakuin gorintō	1169	Hiraizumi	Iwate			39°00′03″N 141°05′55″E	
*Chūson-ji Konjikidō 中尊寺金色堂; Chūsonji Konjikidō	1124	Hiraizumi	Iwate			39°00′05″N 141°05′59″E	
Chūson-ji Sutra Repository 中尊寺経蔵; Chūsonji kyōzō	1064-1184	Hiraizumi	Iwate			39°00′06″N 141°05′58″E	
Kōzō-ji Amidadō 高蔵寺阿弥陀堂; Kōzōji Amidadō	1177	Kakuda	Miyagi			38°00′00″N 140°43′06″E	
Torii 鳥居 torii	1086-1184	Yamagata	Yamagata			38°13′43″N 140°19′44″E	
Hachiman Jinja Torii 八幡神社鳥居; Hachiman Jinja torii	1086-1184	Yamagata	Yamagata			38°12′09″N 140°19′14″E	
*Shiramizu Amidadō 八幡神社鳥居; Shiramizu Amidadō	1160	Iwaki	Fukushima			37°02′11″N 140°50′14″E	
Gorintō 五輪塔 gorintō	1181	Tamakawa	Fukushima			37°13′45″N 140°24′42″E	
*Ishiyama-dera Hondō 石山寺本堂; Ishiyamadera hondō	1096	Ōtsu	Shiga			34°57′38″N 135°54′20″E	
*Ujigami Jinja Honden 宇治上神社本殿; Ujigami Jinja honden	1086-1184	Uji	Kyoto			34°53′31″N 135°48′41″E	
Ōjõ Gokurakuin Amidadõ 往生極楽院阿弥陀堂; Ōjō Gokurakuin Amidadõ	1148	Kyoto	Kyoto			35°07′10″N 135°50′05″E	
Tō-ji Treasure House 教王護国寺宝蔵; Kyōōgokokuji hōzō	1086-1184	Kyoto	Kyoto			34°58′53″N 135°44′56″E	
Kōryū-ji Lecture Hall 広隆寺講堂; Kõryūji kõdõ	1165	Kyoto	Kyoto			35°00′54″N 135°42′23″E	
*Jōruri-ji Three-Storey Pagoda 浄瑠璃寺三重塔; Jōruriji sanjūnotõ	before 1178	Kyoto	Kyoto			34°42′56″N 135°52′25″E	
*Jōruri-ji Hondō 浄瑠璃寺本堂; Jōruriji hondō	1157	Kizugawa	Kyoto			34°42′56″N 135°52′22″E	
*Daigo-ji Kondō 醍醐寺金堂; Daigoji kondō	1086-1184	Kyoto	Kyoto			34°57′05″N 135°49′18″E	
*Daigo-ji Yakushidō 醍醐寺薬師堂; Daigoji Yakushidō	1121	Kyoto	Kyoto			34°56′44″N 135°50′19″E	
Kongō-ji Tahōtō 金剛寺多宝塔; Kongōji tahōtō	1086-1184	Kawachinagano	Osaka			34°25′42″N 135°31′46″E	
*Ichijō-ji Three-Storey Pagoda 一乗寺三重塔; Kongōji tahōtō	1171	Kasai	Hyōgo			34°51′32″N 134°49′08″E	
Kakurin-ji Jōgyōdō 鶴林寺常行堂; Kakurinji jōgyōdō	1086-1184	Kakogawa	Hyōgo			34°45′08″N 134°49′56″E	
*Kakurin-ji Taishidō 鶴林寺太子堂; Kakurinji Taishidō	1112	Kakogawa	Hyōgo			34°45′08″N 134°49′58″E	
Omiashi Jinja Stone Tōba 於美阿志神社石塔婆; Omiashi Jinja ishi tōba	1086-1184	Asuka	Nara			34°27′24″N 135°48′11″E	
Former Fuki-ji Rakandō 旧富貴寺羅漢堂; Fuki-ji Rakandō	1086-1184	Ikaruga	Nara	dismantled, consolidated by the National Research Institute for Cultural Properties, Tokyo, and re-erected in the precincts of Hōryū-ji		34°36′50″N 135°44′16″E	
Gorintō 五輪塔 gorintō	1086-1184	Katsuragi	Nara			34°31′09″N 135°41′43″E	
Murō-ji Nōkyōtō 室生寺納経塔; Murōji nōkyōtō	1086-1184	Uda	Nara			34°32′18″N 136°02′22″E	
Hōryū-ji Tsumamuro 法隆寺妻室; Hōryūji tsumamuro	1121	Ikaruga	Nara			34°36′52″N 135°44′07″E	
Butsuryū-ji Stone Chamber 仏隆寺石室; Butsuryūji sekishitsu	1086-1184	Uda	Nara			34°30′56″N 136°00′35″E	
Eizan-ji Seven-Storey Pagoda 榮山寺七重塔; Eizanji shijijūnotō	1086-1184	Gojō	Nara			34°21′21″N 135°43′13″E	
*Taima-dera Hondō (Mandala-dō) 當麻寺本堂(曼荼羅堂); Taimadera hondō (mandala-dō)	1161	Katsuragi	Nara			34°30′58″N 135°41′41″E	
*Sanbutsu-ji Oku-no-in (Nageire-dō) 三仏寺奥院(投入堂); Sanbutsuji oku-no-in (nageire-dō)	1086-1184	Misasa	Tottori			35°23′47″N 133°57′34″E	
Getsurin-ji Yakushidō 月輪寺薬師堂; Getsurinji Yakushidō	1086-1184	Yamaguchi	Yamaguchi			34°08′36″N 131°43′15″E	
*Buraku-ji Yakushidō 豊楽寺薬師堂; Burakuji Yakushidō	1151	Ōtoyo	Kōchi			33°47′32″N 133°43′38″E	
Gorintō 五輪塔 gorintō	1170	Usuki	Ōita			33°05′23″N 131°45′43″E	
Gorintō 五輪塔 gorintō	1172	Usuki	Ōita			33°05′23″N 131°45′43″E	
*Fuki-ji Ōdō 富貴寺大堂; Fukiji Ōdō	1086-1184	Bungotakada	Ōita			33°32′16″N 131°31′43″E	

== See also ==
- Cultural Properties of Japan
- Japanese Buddhist architecture
- List of Important Cultural Properties of Japan (Nara period: structures)
- List of Important Cultural Properties of Japan (Kamakura period: structures)
