= List of important cultural properties of Japan (Asuka period: structures) =

This list is of Japanese structures dating from the Asuka period (538–710) that have been designated important cultural properties (including *national treasures). Five surviving sites with six component structures have been so designated, all national treasures. All are located in the town of Ikaruga in Nara Prefecture, forming part of the UNESCO World Heritage Site Buddhist Monuments in the Hōryū-ji Area.

== Structures ==
Structure	Date	Municipality	Prefecture	Comments	Image	Coordinates	Ref.
*Hokki-ji Three-Storey Pagoda 法起寺三重塔; Hokkiji sanjūnotō	684-706	Ikaruga	Nara			34°37′22″N 135°44′47″E	
*Hōryū-ji Covered Corridors: East 法隆寺廻廊 (東廻廊); Hōryūji kairō (higashi kairō)	before 709	Ikaruga	Nara			34°36′52″N 135°44′05″E	
*Hōryū-ji Covered Corridors: West 法隆寺廻廊 (西廻廊); Hōryūji kairō (nishi kairō)	before 709	Ikaruga	Nara			34°36′51″N 135°44′02″E	
*Hōryū-ji Kondō 法隆寺金堂; Hōryūji kondō	before 709	Ikaruga	Nara			34°36′51″N 135°44′04″E	
*Hōryū-ji Five-Storey Pagoda 法隆寺五重塔; Hōryūji gojūnotō	before 709	Ikaruga	Nara			34°36′51″N 135°44′03″E	
*Hōryū-ji Inner Gate 法隆寺中門; Hōryūji chūmon	before 709	Ikaruga	Nara			34°36′50″N 135°44′04″E	

== See also ==
- Cultural Properties of Japan
- Japanese Buddhist architecture
- List of Important Cultural Properties of Japan (Nara period: structures)
- Yamada-dera
