= Kaijūsen-ji =

Buddhist temple in Japan

Coordinates: 34.7768°N 135.8619°E

Kaijūsen-ji is a Buddhist temple in Kizugawa, Kyoto Prefecture, Japan. Its five-storied pagoda is a National Treasure of Japan.

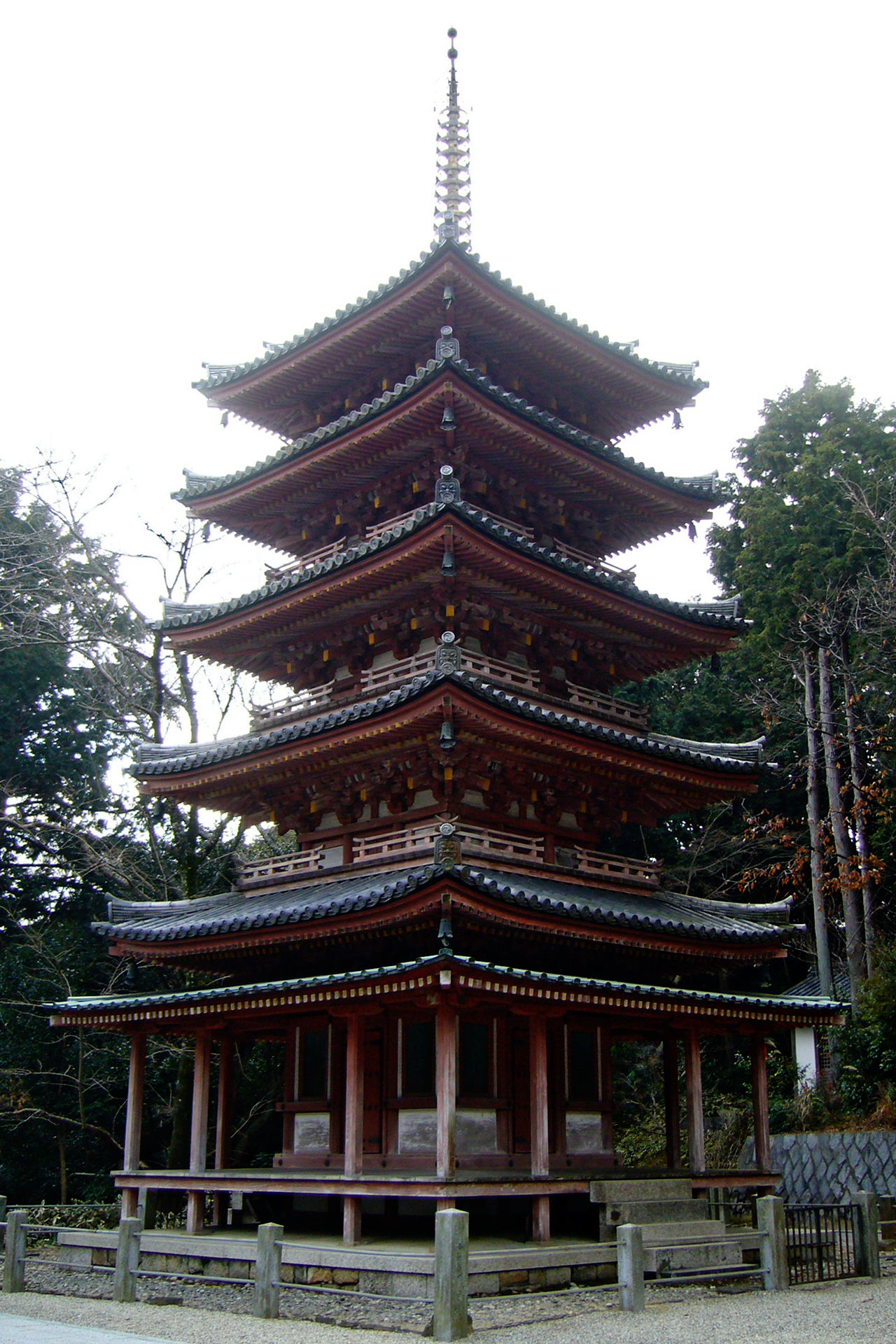
