= List of important cultural properties of Japan (Nara period: structures) =

This list is of Japanese structures dating from the Nara period (710–794) that have been designated important cultural properties (including *national treasures). Twenty-three surviving sites with the same number of component structures have been so designated. All but three are national treasures and all but one is in Nara Prefecture. Fourteen are located in the city of Nara; those at Tōdai-ji, Gangō-ji, Tōshōdai-ji, and Yakushi-ji form part of the UNESCO World Heritage Site Historic Monuments of Ancient Nara. Six are at Hōryū-ji, part of the World Heritage Site Buddhist Monuments in the Hōryū-ji Area.

== Structures ==
Structure	Date	Municipality	Prefecture	Comments	Image	Coordinates	Ref.
Sekitō-ji Three-Storey Pagoda 石塔寺三重塔; Sekitōji sanjūnotō	710-793	Higashiōmi	Shiga			35°04′12″N 136°12′27″E	
*Kairyūō-ji Miniature Five-Storey Pagoda 海竜王寺五重小塔; Kairyūōji gojūnoshōtō	729-749	Nara	Nara			34°41′34″N 135°48′19″E	
Kairyūō-ji West Kondō 海竜王寺西金堂; Kairyūōji nishi kondō	710-793	Nara	Nara			34°41′34″N 135°48′19″E	
*Gangō-ji Miniature Five-Storey Pagoda 元興寺極楽坊五重小塔; Gangōji Gokurakubō gojūnoshōtō	710-793	Nara	Nara			34°40′40″N 135°49′53″E	
Tamukeyama Jinja Treasury 手向山神社宝庫; Tamukeyama Jinja hōko	710-793	Nara	Nara			34°41′16″N 135°50′38″E	
*Shinyakushi-ji Hondō 新薬師寺本堂; Shinyakushiji hondō	710-793	Nara	Nara			34°40′33″N 135°50′46″E	
*Shōsōin 正倉院正倉; Shōsōin shōsō	756	Nara	Nara			34°41′31″N 135°50′19″E	
*Tōshōdai-ji Kondō 唐招提寺金堂; Tōshōdaiji kondō	710-793	Nara	Nara			34°40′32″N 135°47′05″E	
*Tōshōdai-ji Sutra Repository 唐招提寺経蔵; Tōshōdaiji kyōzō	710-793	Nara	Nara			34°40′32″N 135°47′08″E	
*Tōshōdai-ji Lecture Hall 唐招提寺講堂; Tōshōdaiji kōdō	710-793	Nara	Nara			34°40′33″N 135°47′05″E	
*Tōshōdai-ji Treasure House 唐招提寺宝蔵; Tōshōdaiji hōzō	710-793	Nara	Nara			34°40′33″N 135°47′08″E	
*Tōdai-ji Tegaimon 東大寺転害門; Tōdaiji Tegaimon	c.757-765	Nara	Nara			34°41′30″N 135°50′06″E	
*Tōdai-ji Hokkedō 東大寺法華堂; Tōdaiji Hokkedō	747	Nara	Nara			34°41′19″N 135°50′39″E	
*Tōdai-ji Sutra Repository 東大寺本坊経庫; Tōdaiji Honbōkyōko	710-793	Nara	Nara			34°41′09″N 135°50′26″E	
*Hōryū-ji Sutra Repository 法隆寺経蔵; Hōryūji kyōzo	710-793	Ikaruga	Nara			34°36′52″N 135°44′02″E	
*Hōryū-ji Refectory 法隆寺食堂及び細殿; Hōryūji jikidō oyobi hosodono	710-793	Ikaruga	Nara			34°36′53″N 135°44′08″E	
*Hōryū-ji East Precinct Denpōdō 法隆寺東院伝法堂; Hōryūji tōin denpōdō	710-793	Ikaruga	Nara			34°36′53″N 135°44′20″E	
*Hōryū-ji East Precinct Yumedono 法隆寺東院夢殿; Hōryūji tōin yumedono	739	Ikaruga	Nara			34°36′52″N 135°44′20″E	
*Hōryū-ji East Dormitory 法隆寺東室; Hōryūji higashi muro	710-793	Ikaruga	Nara			34°36′52″N 135°44′06″E	
*Hōryū-ji Tōdaimon 法隆寺東大門; Hōryūji tōdaimon	710-793	Ikaruga	Nara			34°36′50″N 135°44′12″E	
*Yakushi-ji East Pagoda 薬師寺東塔; Yakushiji tōtō	730	Nara	Nara			34°40′05″N 135°47′05″E	
*Eizan-ji Octagonal Hall 榮山寺八角堂; Eizanji hakkakudō	757-765	Gojō	Nara			34°21′21″N 135°43′16″E	
*Taima-dera East Pagoda 當麻寺東塔; Taimadera tōtō	710-793	Katsuragi	Nara			34°30′55″N 135°41′45″E	

== See also ==
- Cultural Properties of Japan
- Japanese Buddhist architecture
- List of Important Cultural Properties of Japan (Asuka period: structures)
- List of Important Cultural Properties of Japan (Heian period: structures)
