= Kamiyodo Haiji =

Buddhist temple in Yonago, Japan

Kamiyodo temple ruins
- 上淀廃寺跡 (Japanese)
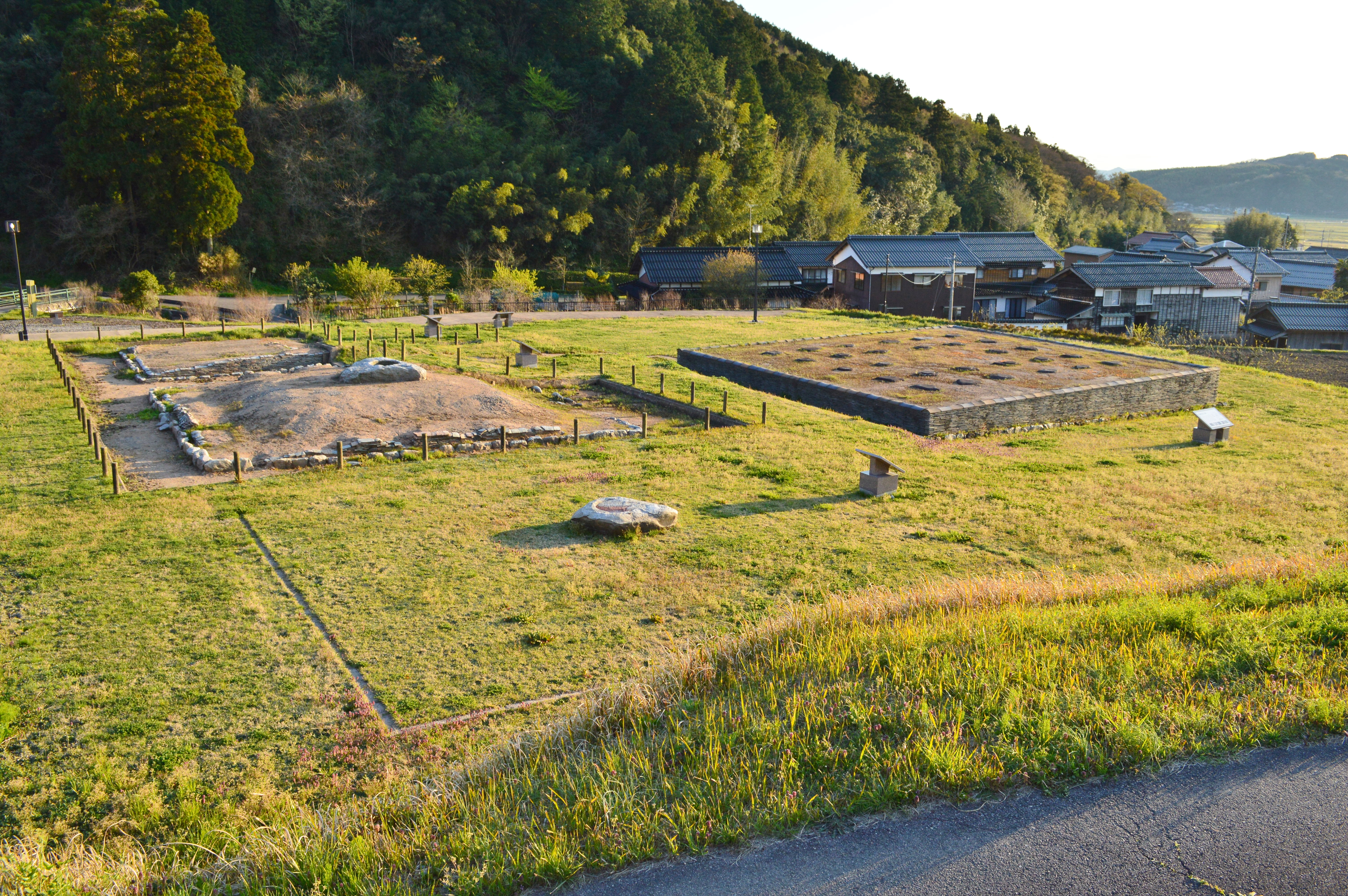
- Kamiyodo temple ruins

- Kamiyodo temple ruins Kamiyodo Haiji (Japan)
- Interactive map of Kamiyodo temple ruins
- 35°27′15.0″N 133°26′45.1″E
- Type: temple ruins
- Periods: Hakuhō period
- Location: Yonago, Tottori, Japan
- Region: San'in region

History
- Built: 6th century AD

Site notes
- Public access: Yes (museum)

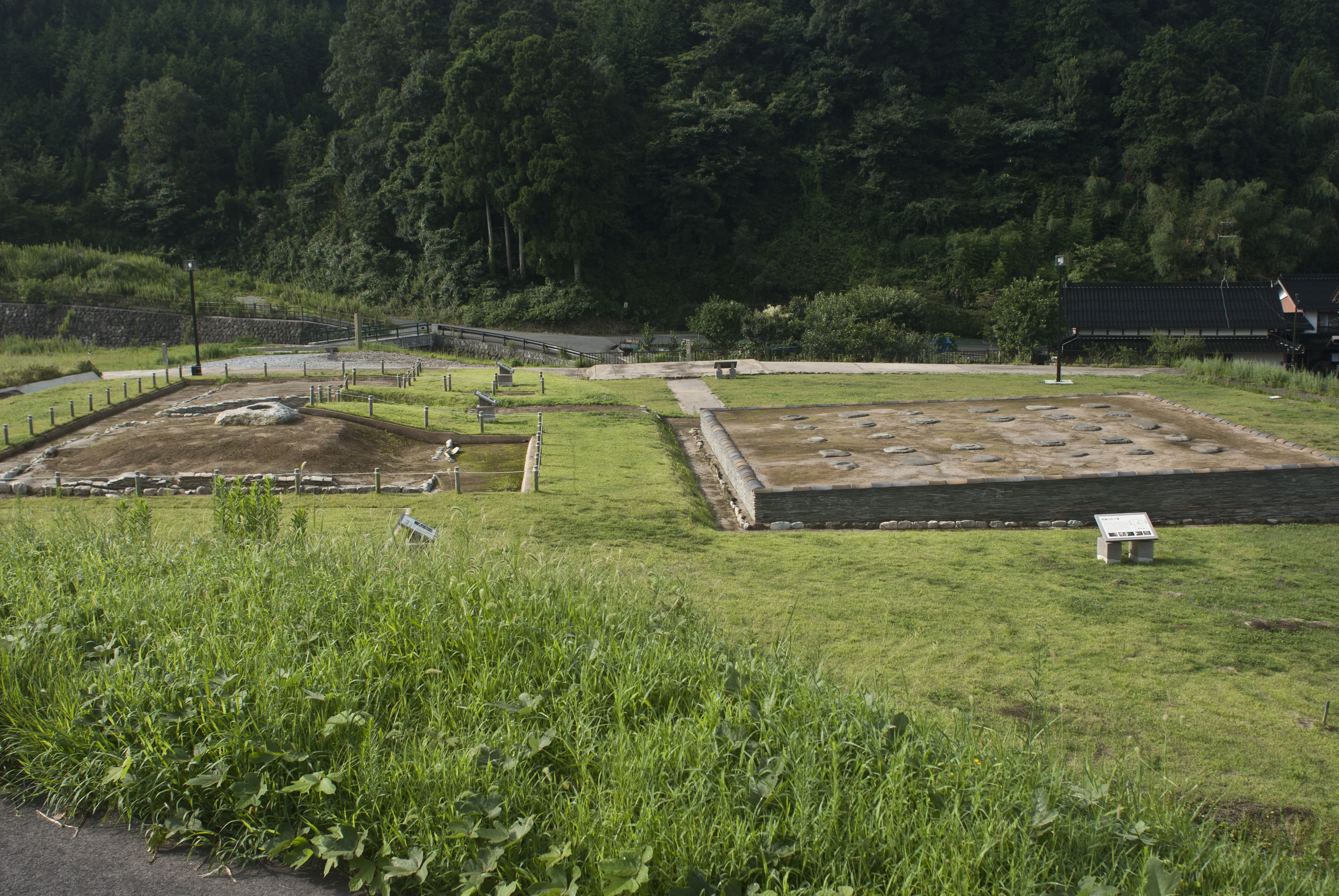
Sites of the eastern pagodas (left) and Kondō (right)

Kamiyodo temple ruins (上淀廃寺跡, Kamiyodo Haiji ato) is an archeological site with the ruins of a Hakuhō period Buddhist temple located in the Yodoe neighborhood of the city of Yonago, Tottori prefecture, in the San'in region of Japan. It was designated a National Historic Site in 1996, with the area under protection expanded in 2005. The current designated area is 25,560 square meters. The site is about a 20-minute walk from Yodoe Station on the JR West San'in Main Line.

== History ==
The Kamiyodo temple ruins are located in paddy fields on the southern slope of a hill facing the Sea of Japan at the northwestern foot of Mount Daisen. Archaeological excavations between 1991 and 1993 uncovered temple buildings of the late Asuka period (end of the seventh or beginning of the eighth century). The complex, which has an unusual plan, appears to have been destroyed by fire during the tenth or eleventh century. From the site of the Kondō, hundreds of fragments of early Buddhist wall painting have been recovered. These were at the time identified as the earliest in Japan, alongside the wall paintings of the Hōryū-ji kondō in Ikaruga, Nara, to which they bora marked resemblance. The mural paintings show a considerable sophistication of decoration despite the remoteness of the site, far from the political centre in the Yamato plain.

== Temple complex ==
The compound includes a Kondō that measures 14.8 metres (49 ft) east to west by 12.4 metres (41 ft) north to south. Unusually, the foundations of three pagodas have been identified to the east of the Kondō, arranged from north to south. The site of what appears from its size, foundation stone, and fallen roof tiles to have been a further, three-story pagoda has been uncovered to the west of the Kondō. Behind were a number of further buildings. Both the Kondō and the pagodas have double foundations, which is also characteristic of Baekje architecture. However, as for the north tower, although the central foundation supporting the central pillar of the tower was found, the remainder of foundation was not confirmed, so it is possible that it had been planned but never completed. Nevertheless less, there is no other example of a temple arrangement with a three pagoda layout, and there is no other ancient temple that arranges two pagodas north and south. Each of the pagodashad a 3 x 3 bay layout, or 9.5 meters on each side. The Kondō was a 14.2 by 12.5 meter structure.

The foundations of the Middle Gate and cloister has been found, but the exact locations of the Lecture Hall and South Gate are unknown due to agricultural land development. It is estimated that the central part of temple complex was about 55 meters square, and the total size of the temple area was about 212 meters east-to-west by 106 meters north-to-south. One of the roof tiles is engraved with the year 'Kimi,' and is believed to have been built around 683. In the vicinity of the main hall and the central and south towers, there is a layer of burnt clay mixed with fragments of roof tiles, debris from walls, broken statues, and earthenware shards.The round eaves tiles also have an unusual twelve-petal lotus design, which is more typical of temples found in Silla on the Korean Peninsula than in Japan. It is believed that the temple completed in the late 7th century, repaired in the middle of the 8th century, and destroyed by fire in the 10th century.

In all, 5,500 fragments of wall painting and 3,300 fragments of sculpture were recovered from the site, together with a large quantity of roof tiles and items of iron and bronze.

== Wall paintings ==
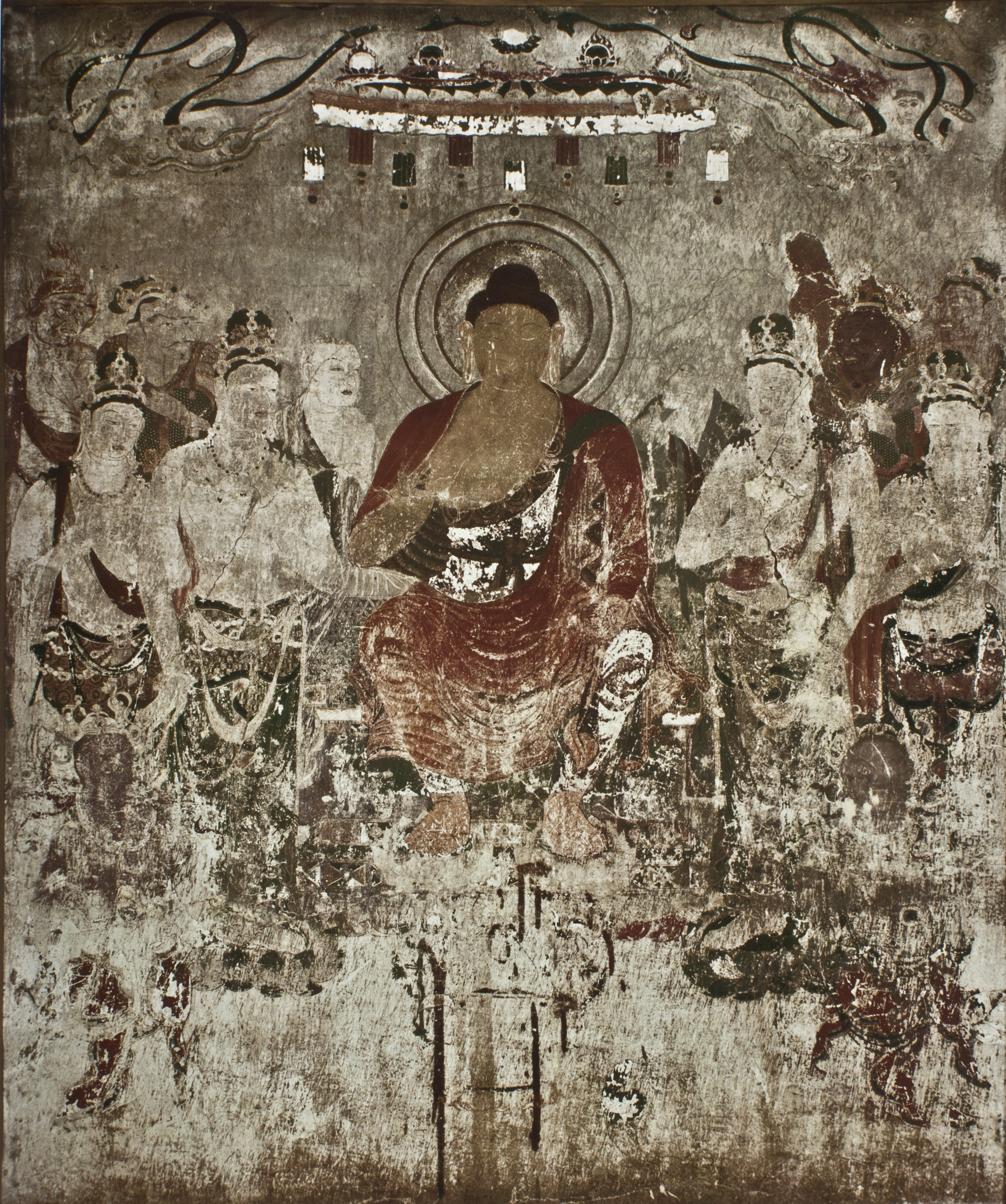
East panel of the north wall of the Hōryū-ji Kondō, showing the eastern paradise of Yakushi Nyorai; a number of mural fragments from Kamiyodo Haiji have been located in a similar scheme in reconstruction drawings, identified as parts of a canopy, flanking tennin's robe, nimbus, seated Buddha's robe, dais, heavenly general, bodhisattva, and lotus pedestal

Among the fragments of painting are the heads of a heavenly general and bodhisattva, a cuirass, sections of robe, flowers, grasses, lotus petals, part of a decorated canopy, and a mountain with three peaks emerging from the clouds, the precursor of later landscape painting. It is presumed to be a painting of a sermon and is strongly influenced by the Baekje style. Some of the mural paintings show only the halo and lotus position of the Buddha statue, but do not depict the actual Buddha statue, and the original intention is not clear. The paintings were executed upon an earthen render, the lower layer comprising clay and chopped straw, the upper more sandy soil with finer vegetable fibres; the surface was prepared for painting with a white clay ground. The range of pigments as much as the subject matter shows the impact of foreign culture from the mainland: unlike the limited pallette of the decorated tombs before the introduction of Buddhism, the painting fragments show the use of vermilion, red ochre, minium, yellow ochre, massicot, malachite, azurite, white clay, and lampblack ink.

== Preservation ==
An area of 25,560 square metres (275,100 sq ft) encompassing the excavations was designated a National Historic Site in 1996. In 2006/2007 the site was relandscaped at a cost of ¥111.3 million. In 2009 the excavated artefacts were designated a Prefectural Tangible Cultural Property. The nearby Kamiyodo Hakuhō-no-Oka Exhibition Hall opened in 2011; exhibits include fragments of the wall paintings and a reconstruction of the interior of the kondō complete with paintings and sculptures. The fragments of painting themselves have been consolidated with an epoxy resin.

== Early temple wall painting ==
Initially the paintings, understood to be coeval with the construction of the Kondō in the late Asuka period (end of the seventh or beginning of the eighth century), were hailed as the earliest temple mural painting in Japan, alongside the wall paintings of the Hōryū-ji kondō. During excavation in 2004 of the Wakakusa-garan, however, the old Hōryū-ji complex before the 670 fire, hundreds of fragments of wall painting dating to the first half of the seventh century were unearthed, with heat-induced pigment alteration. Two fragments of fire-damaged plaster recovered from excavations of Yamada-dera in 1978 have also been recently attributed to a wall painting, of mid-seventh century date. Late Asuka-period wall paintings are now known from Hiokimae Haiji (日置前廃寺) in Takashima, Shiga. Fragments of red plaster have also been recovered from the site of the pagoda of Daikandai-ji, constructed in 698 and destroyed by fire in 711. Wall paintings of a similar date were uncovered in the five-storey pagoda of Hōryū-ji in the 1940s; these suggest the use of stencils and have been designated an Important Cultural Property.

== See also ==
- List of Historic Sites of Japan (Tottori)
- List of Important Cultural Properties of Japan (Asuka period: structures)
- Takamatsuzuka Tomb
- Tamamushi Shrine
