= Kamiyodo Hakuhō-no-Oka Exhibition Hall =

- 上淀白鳳の丘展示館
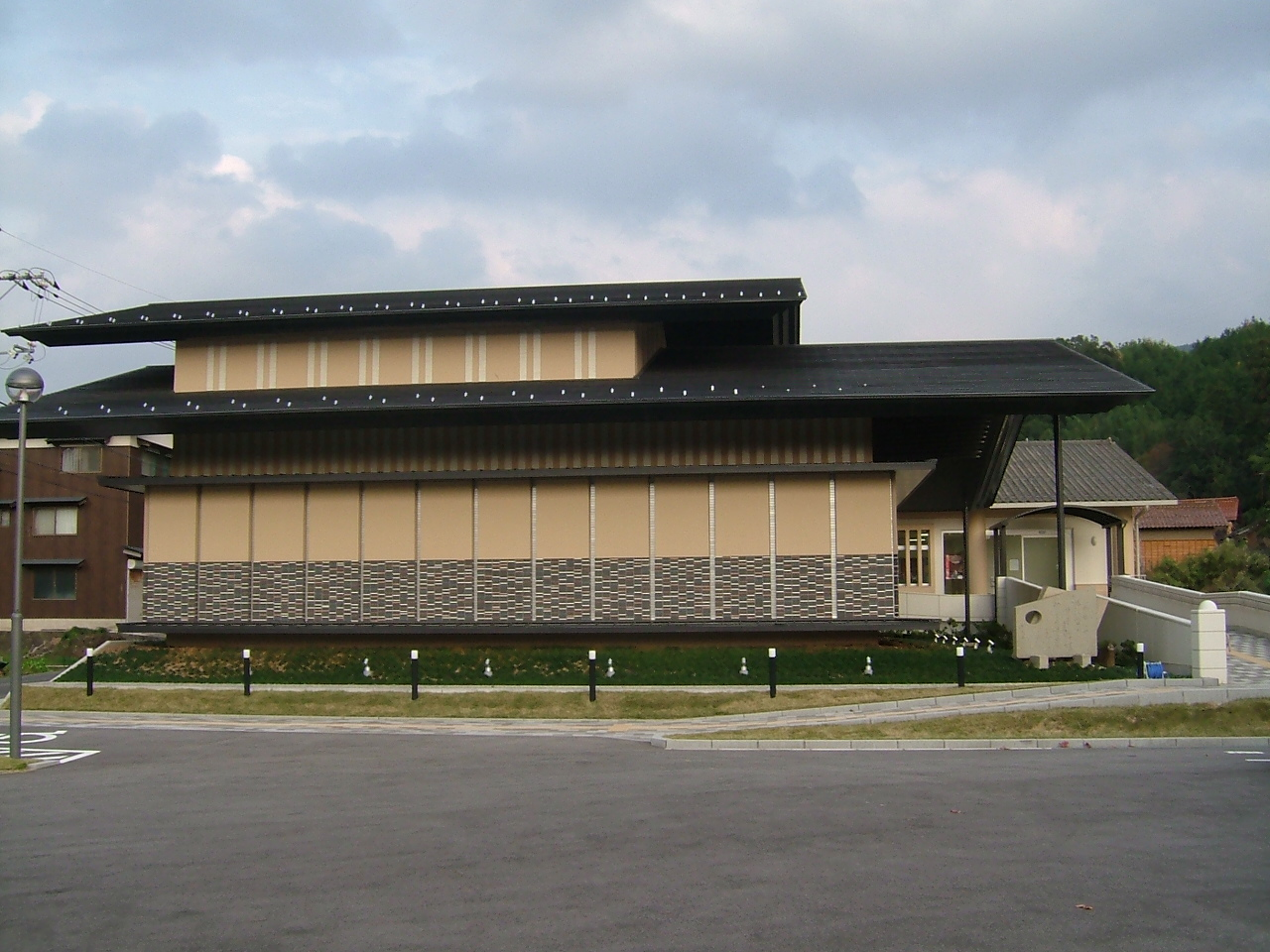
- Interactive map of the Kamiyodo Hakuhō-no-Oka Exhibition Hall area

General information
- Location: 1548-1 Fukuoka, Yodoe-chō, Yonago, Tottori Prefecture, Japan
- Coordinates: 35°27′13″N 133°26′35″E
- Opened: 24 April 2011

Website
- homepage (jp)

Kamiyodo Hakuhō-no-Oka Exhibition Hall (上淀白鳳の丘展示館, Kamiyodo Hakuhō-no-oka tenjikan) opened in Yonago, Tottori Prefecture, Japan in 2011. It replaced the Yonago Yodoe Folk History Museum (米子市淀江歴史民俗資料館), which closed in 2009. The three rooms of the exhibition hall display Yayoi decorated pottery, haniwa statues, fragments of early Buddhist wall painting from Kamiyodo Haiji, and a reconstruction of the temple kondō, with its paintings and sculptures.

== See also ==
- List of Historic Sites of Japan (Tottori)
- Wall paintings of the Hōryū-ji kondō
