= Hōryū-ji =

Buddhist temple in Nara Prefecture, Japan

Hōryū-ji 法隆寺
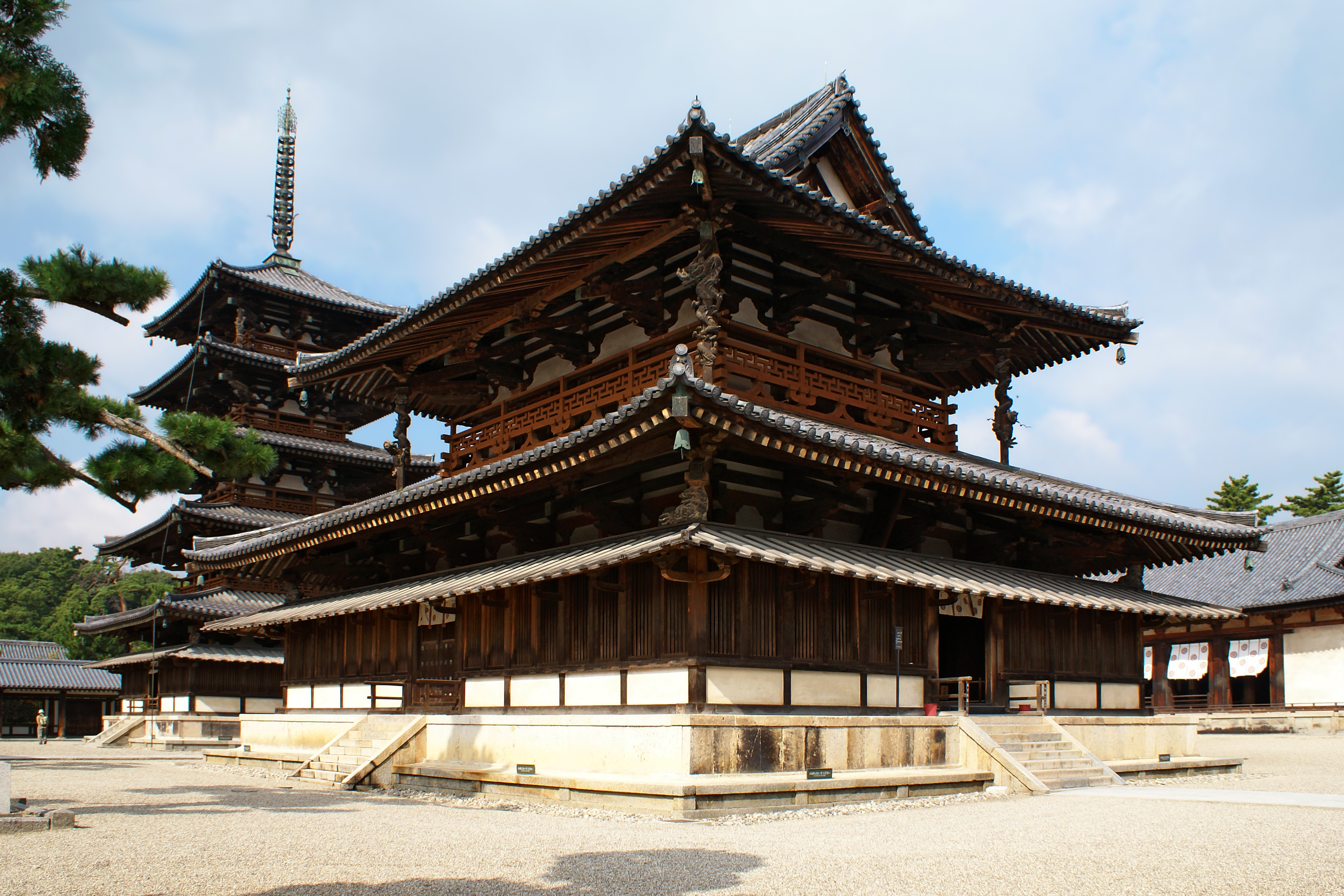
- Kondo

Religion
- Affiliation: Shōtoku
- Deity: Shaka Nyorai (Śākyamuni)

Location
- Location: 1-1 Hōryū-ji Sannai, Ikaruga-chō, Ikoma-gun, Nara Prefecture
- Country: Japan
- Interactive map of Hōryū-ji 法隆寺
- Coordinates: 34°36′52″N 135°44′03″E

Architecture
- Founder: Empress Suiko, Prince Shōtoku
- Completed: 607; 1419 years ago

Website
- www.horyuji.or.jp

Hōryū-ji (Japanese: 法隆寺; lit. 'Temple of the Flourishing Dharma') is a Buddhist temple that was once one of the powerful Seven Great Temples, located in Ikaruga, Nara Prefecture, Japan. Built shortly after Buddhism was introduced to Japan, it is also one of the oldest Buddhist sites in the country. Its full name is Hōryū Gakumonji (法隆学問寺), or Learning Temple of the Flourishing Law, with the complex serving as both a seminary and monastery.

The temple was founded by Prince Shōtoku in 607. According to the Nihon Shoki, in 670 all buildings were burned down by lightning. Reconstruction of the temple complex began soon after. Rebuilt at least 1,300 years ago, the Kondō (main hall) is widely recognized as the world's oldest wooden building. A tree ring survey conducted in 2001 revealed that the shinbashira of the five-story pagoda were cut down in 594, before it burned down in 670.

On January 26, 1949, a fire broke out during the dismantling and repair of the Kondō. This heavily damaged the building and also destroyed a mural of the Asuka period, a national treasure, shocking the Japanese. Based on this accident, January 26 is now fire prevention day for cultural properties.

In 1993, Hōryū-ji Temple, along with Hokki-ji, was registered as Japan's first UNESCO World Heritage Site under the name of Buddhist Monuments in the Hōryū-ji Area.

== History ==
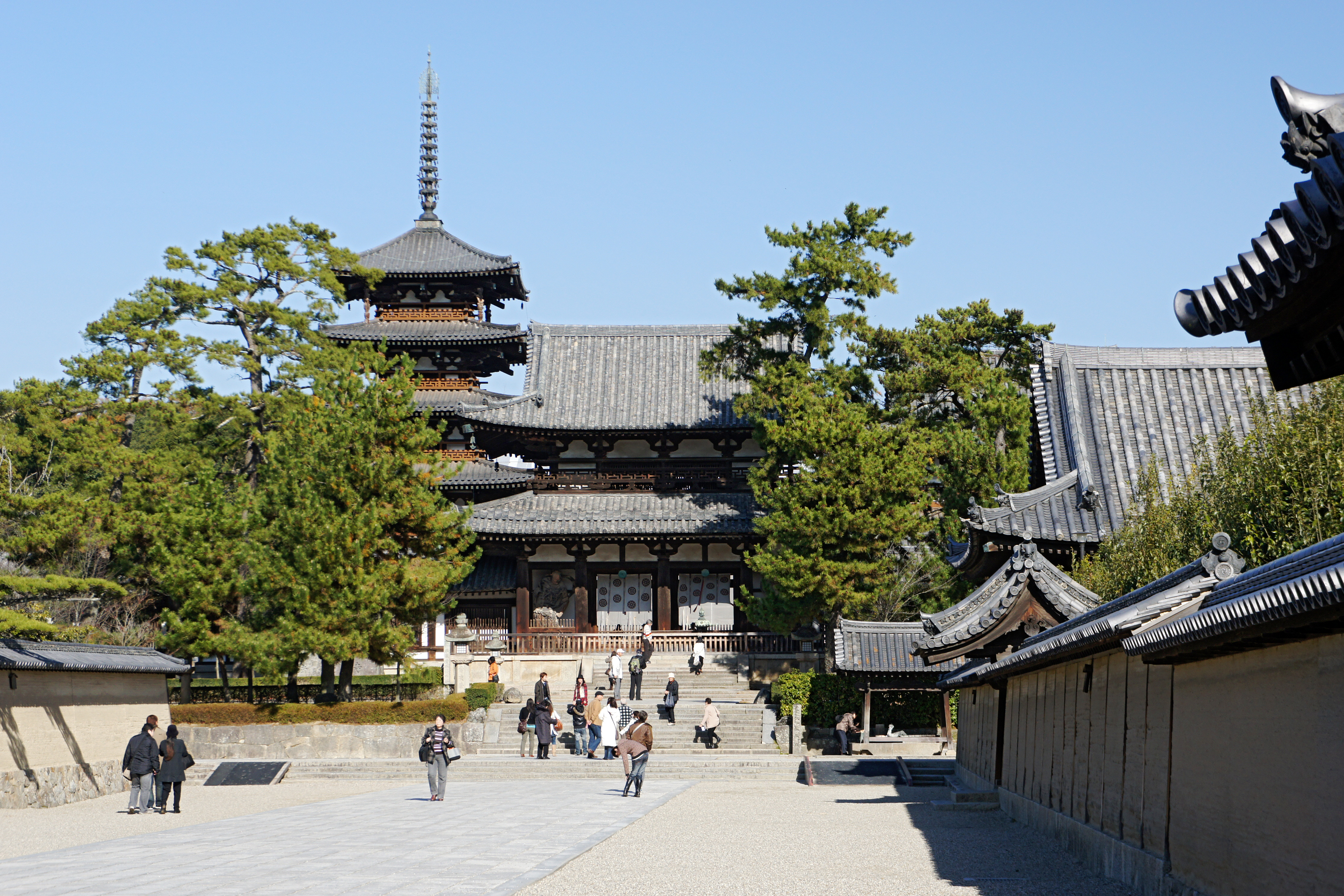
Shichidō garan

The temple was originally commissioned by Prince Shōtoku; at the time it was called Wakakusadera, a name that is still sometimes used. This first temple is believed to have been completed by 607. Hōryū-ji was dedicated to Yakushi Nyorai, the Buddha of healing and in honor of the prince's father. Excavations done in 1939 confirmed that Prince Shotoku's palace, the Ikaruga-no-miya (斑鳩宮), occupied the eastern part of the current temple complex, where the Tō-in (東院) sits today. Also discovered were the ruins of a temple complex which was southwest of the prince's palace and not completely within the present temple complex. The original temple, named by modern historians and archaeologists Wakakusa-garan (若草伽藍), was lost, probably burned to the ground after being hit by lightning in 670. The temple was reconstructed but slightly reoriented in a northwest position, which is believed to have been completed by around 711. The temple was repaired and reassembled in the early twelfth century, in 1374, and 1603.

During the Kamakura period, as the cult of Shōtoku rose to prominence in Japan, Hōryū-ji became an important site for veneration of the long-dead prince. Ritual practices dedicated to Prince Shōtoku increased in number during this time. A memorial service for the prince called the ceremony of Shōryō-e became an annual event at Hōryū-ji in the early 12th century, and it is still practiced at the temple and other temples associated with Prince Shōtoku to this day. The Kamakura and early Heian period also brought new additions to Hōryū-ji, including the dedication of several new halls in the Eastern and Western compounds to venerate the Prince as the incarnation of the bodhisattva Kannon. The growth of the Shōtoku cult from the 7th century onward propelled the rise of Hōryū-ji as a well-known temple in Japan. By the end of Tokugawa rule in the mid-1800s, the temple was receiving extensive funds from the shogunate on a regular basis. Furthermore, the temple grew and maintained close relations with the Hossō sect throughout the Edo period.

Beginning in the early years of the Meiji period, significant political shifts in Japan brought new challenges for Hōryū-ji. Shinto was instated as the official state religion in 1868, resulting in government confiscation of many Buddhist lands, strict government supervision and categorization of Buddhist temples, and a steep decrease in financial support for Hōryū-ji itself. The recategorization of officially recognized Buddhist sects by the government, which occurred soon after the start of Meiji rule, did not recognize the Hossō sect as a formal institution of Japanese Buddhism. When the seat of the Hossō sect, Kōfuku-ji, was shut down for a time during the Meiji restoration, Hōryū-ji became affiliated with Shingon Buddhism. However, after the government changed its position and allowed Buddhist temples to choose their own affiliated sect in the late 19th century, Hōryū-ji renewed its affiliation with the Hossō school. Due to the lack of resources during the early Meiji period, the monks at Hōryū-ji decided to donate many of the temple's treasures for museum display. They were able to secure compensation for this donation, improving the financial situation of the temple. Conservation work at the site began in 1895, but culminated in 1934, when a massive restoration project at Hōryū-ji began. The project was interrupted during the Second World War, when large portions of the temple itself were dismantled and hidden in the hills surrounding Nara. However, due to the policy of the United States of America regarding the preservation of cultural sites in Nara and Kyoto, the entire site was spared from bombings during the war. The restoration project resumed after the war and concluded in 1985. Much of the temple complex was repaired from centuries of environmental damage. During the restoration, older paintings of the temple were used to determine the original layout of the complex, and many of the living quarters built during the intervening years were demolished.

Today, the temple can be identified as the headquarters of the Shōtoku sect, and is a popular site for pilgrimage. As a UNESCO World Heritage Site, Hōryū-ji is also an attractive site for tourists. According to the temple's website, it is currently home to over 180 of Japan's designated National Treasures and Important Cultural Properties, and was the first structure in Japan to become a World Heritage Site. Hōryū-ji also still holds frequent events in a variety of locations in the complex, and many of its structures are open to the public.

== Architecture ==
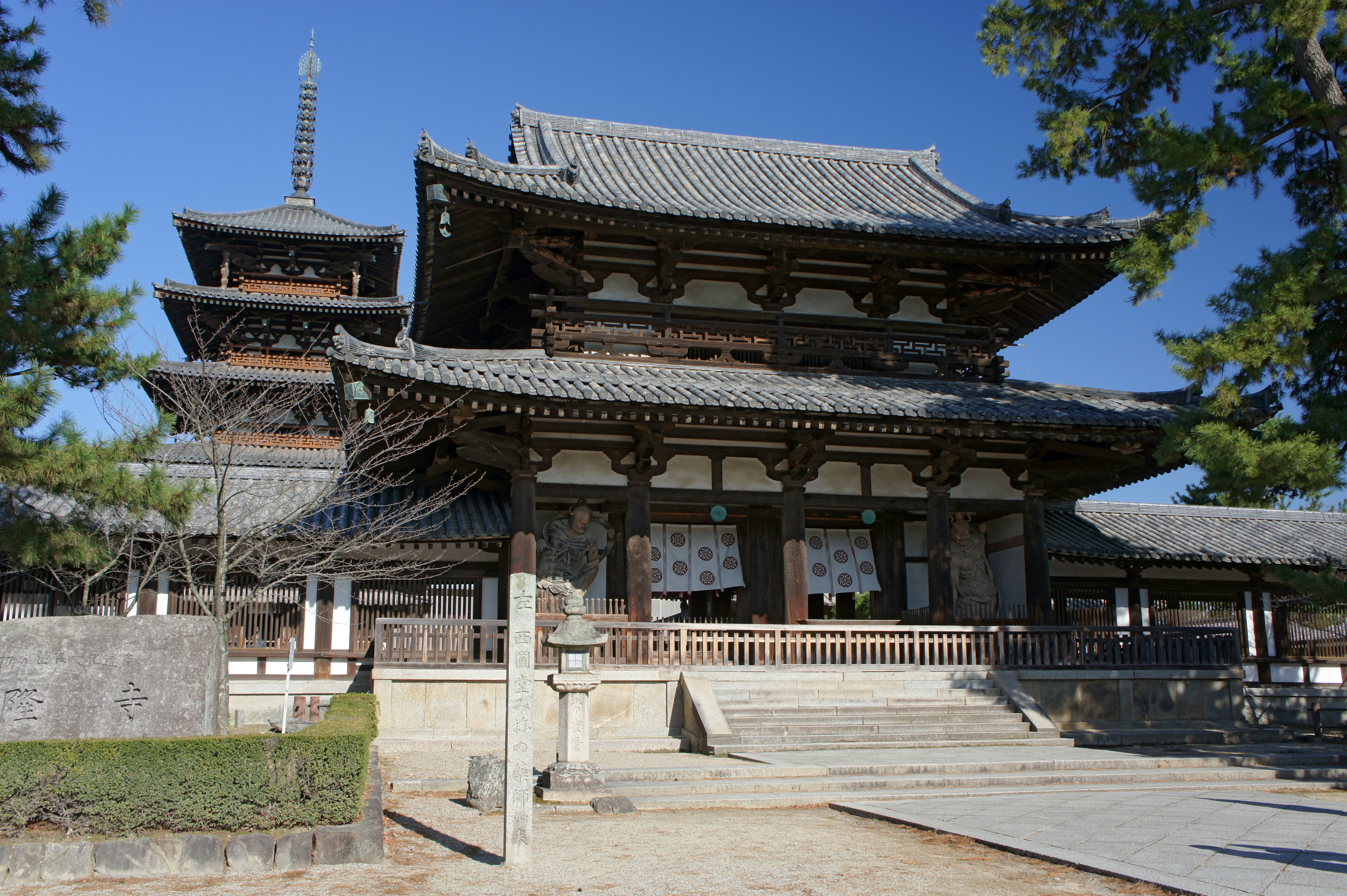
The Chūmon (Inner Gate) with its entasis columns

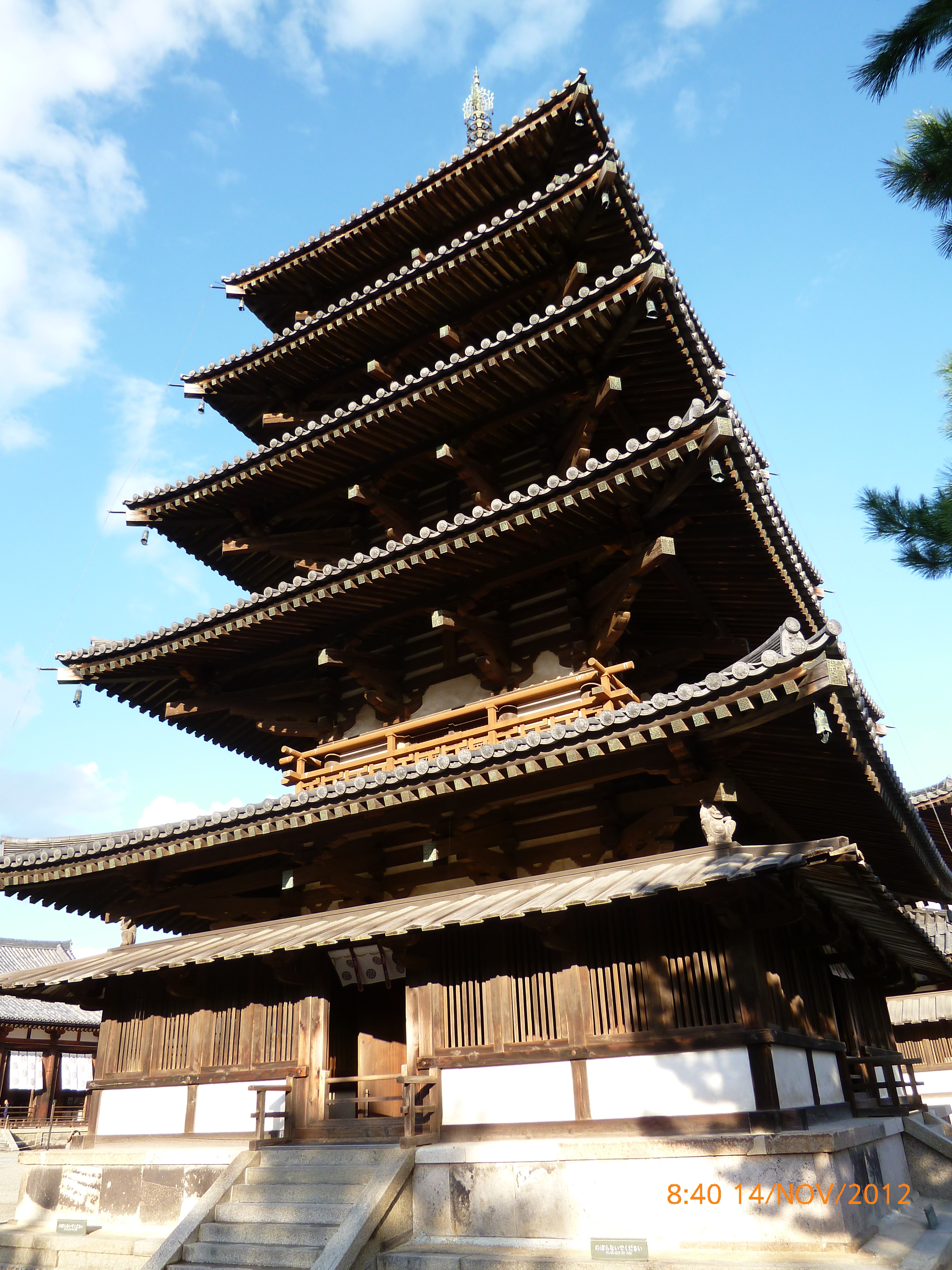
Buddhist Monuments in the Hōryū-ji Area

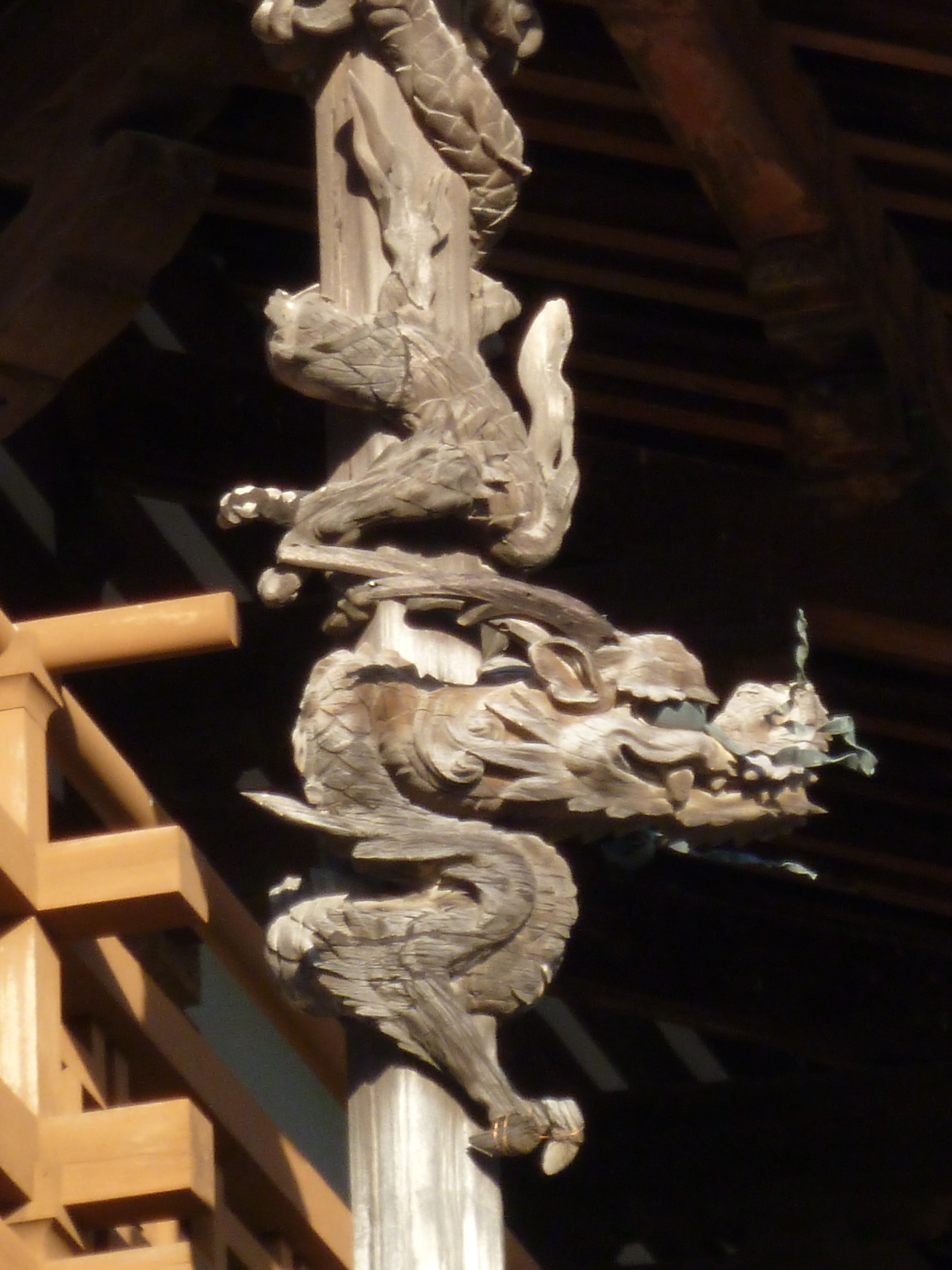
Closer look of wooden carving in Buddhist Monuments in the Hōryū-ji Area

=== Present complex ===
The current temple is made up of two areas, the Sai-in (西院) in the west and the Tō-in (東院) in the east. The western part of the temple contains the Kondō (金堂, sanctuary Hall) and the temple's five-story pagoda. The Tō-in area holds the octagonal Yumedono Hall (夢殿, Hall of Dreams) and sits 122 meters east of the Sai-in area. The complex also contains monk's quarters, lecture halls, libraries, and dining halls.

=== Characteristics ===
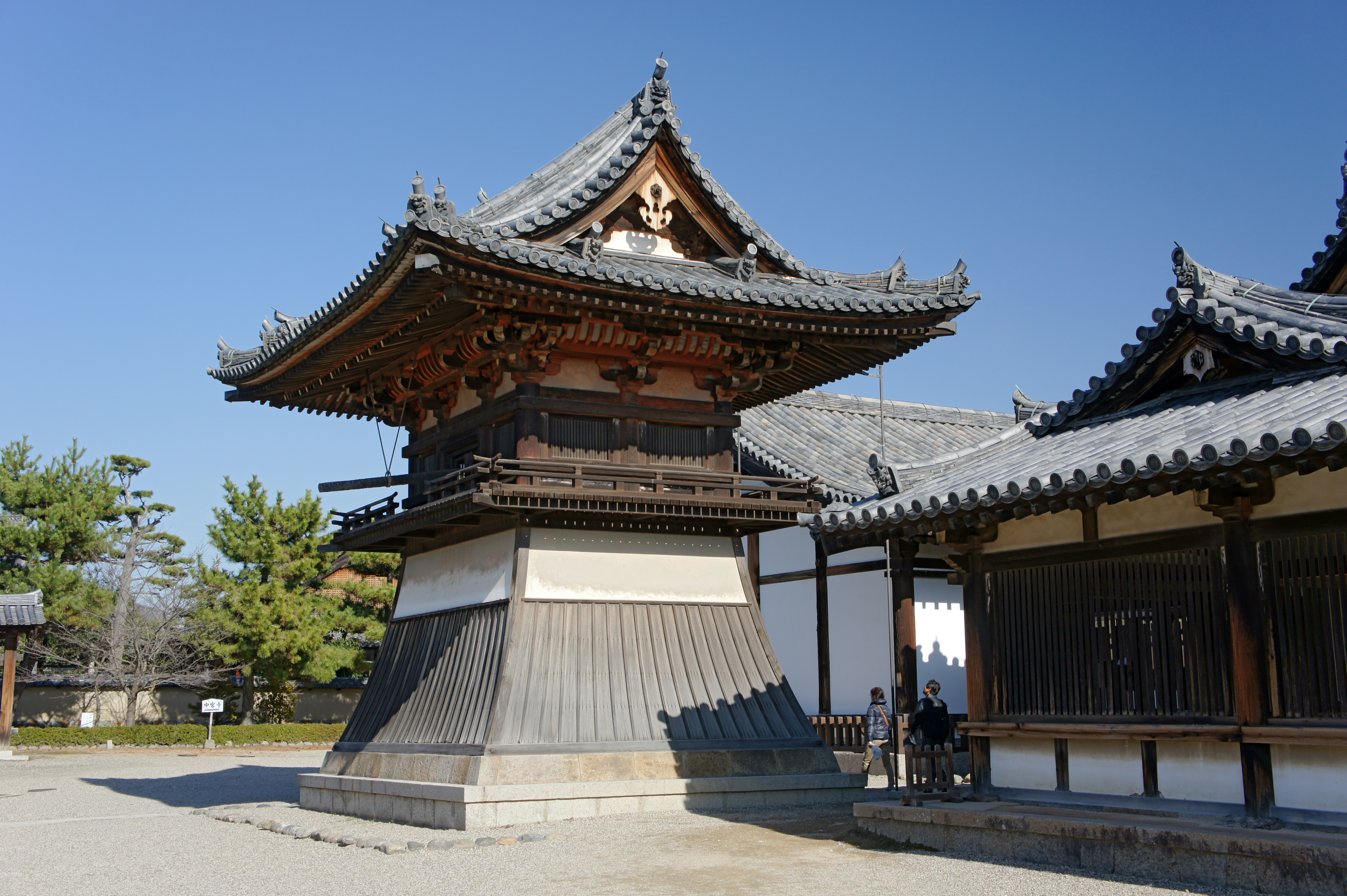
The belfry of the East Precinct

The reconstructed buildings embrace significant cultural influences from the Three Kingdoms of Korea, particularly those of Baekje, and from Eastern Han to Northern Wei of China.

The reconstruction has allowed Hōryū-ji to absorb and feature a unique fusion of early Asuka period style elements, added with some distinct ones only seen in Hōryū-ji, such as the extremely small proportions of the fifth story of the pagoda, which buildings constructed in later years lack. It is also home to unique examples of early Japanese architecture, such as the Tamamushi Shrine.

There are many features that suggest the current precinct of Hōryū-ji is not entirely related to the Asuka period style in the same way as other works from the period. Scholars note that the style of Hōryū-ji is more "conservative" than other examples from the period, such as Yakushiji.

=== Pagoda ===
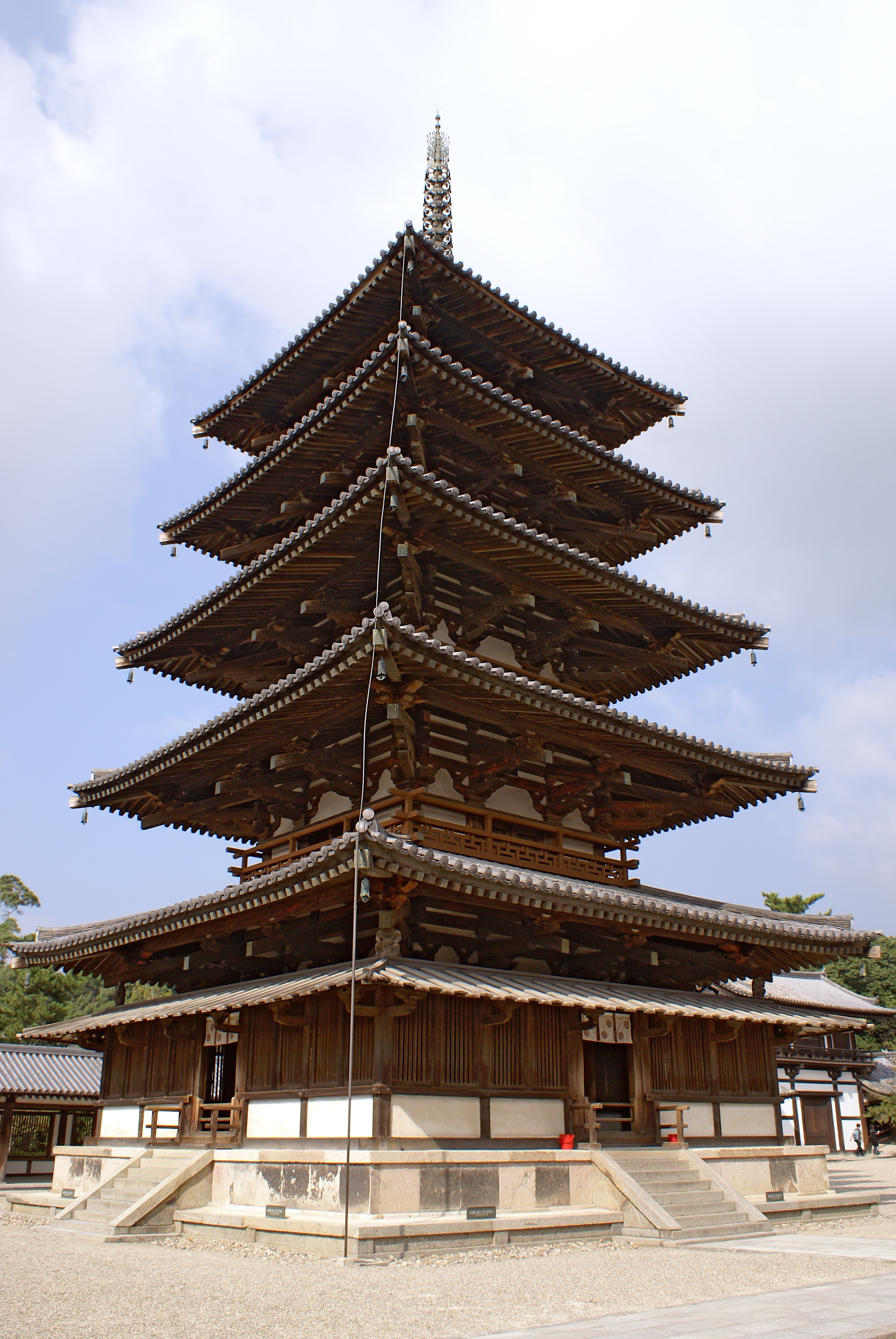
The pagoda has certain characteristics unique to Hōryū-ji.

The five-story pagoda, located in Sai-in area, stands at 32.45 meters in height (122 feet) and is one of the oldest extant wooden buildings in the world. The wood used in the central pillar or axis mundi of the pagoda is estimated through a dendrochronological analysis to have been felled in 594. The axis mundi rests three meters below the surface of the massive foundation stone, stretching into the ground. At its base, a relic believed to be a fragment of the bones of the Buddha is enshrined. Around it, four sculpted scenes from the life of the Buddha face in the four cardinal directions. The pagoda is five-storied but, as is customary for pagodas, there is no access to the interior.

=== Kondō ===
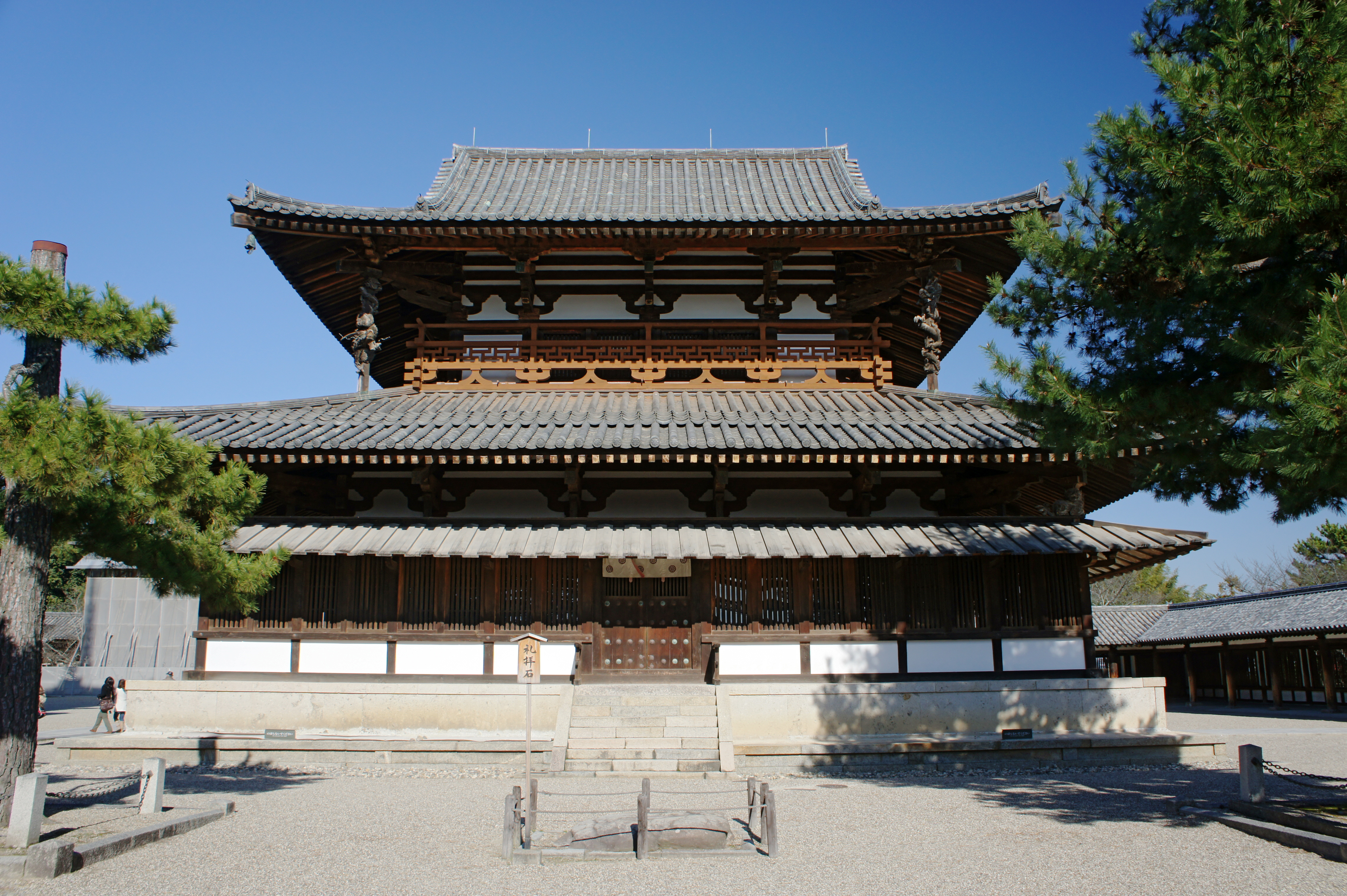
The kondō

The kondō, located side by side to the pagoda in Sai-in, is another one of the oldest wood buildings extant in the world. The hall measures 18.5 meters by 15.2 meters. The hall has two stories, with roofs curved in the corners. Only the first story has a double roof. This was added later in the Nara period with extra posts to hold up the original first roof because it extended more than four meters past the building.

Due to a fire that broke out on January 26, 1949, severe damage was caused to the building, mainly its first floor, and the murals. As a result of the restoration (completed in 1954), it is estimated that about fifteen to twenty percent of the original seventh century Kondo materials is left in the current building, while the charred members were carefully removed and rebuilt to a separate fireproof warehouse for future research.

Through a recent dendrochronological analysis carried out using the materials preserved during the restorations done in the 1950s, it has turned out that some of them were felled prior to 670, suggesting a possibility that the current kondō was already under construction when "the fire in 670", as recorded in the Nihon Shoki, burned the former Wakakusa-garan down.

The hall holds the famous Shaka Triad, together with a bronze Yakushi and Amida Nyorai statues, and other national treasures. The wall paintings shown today in the Kondō are a reproduction from 1967.

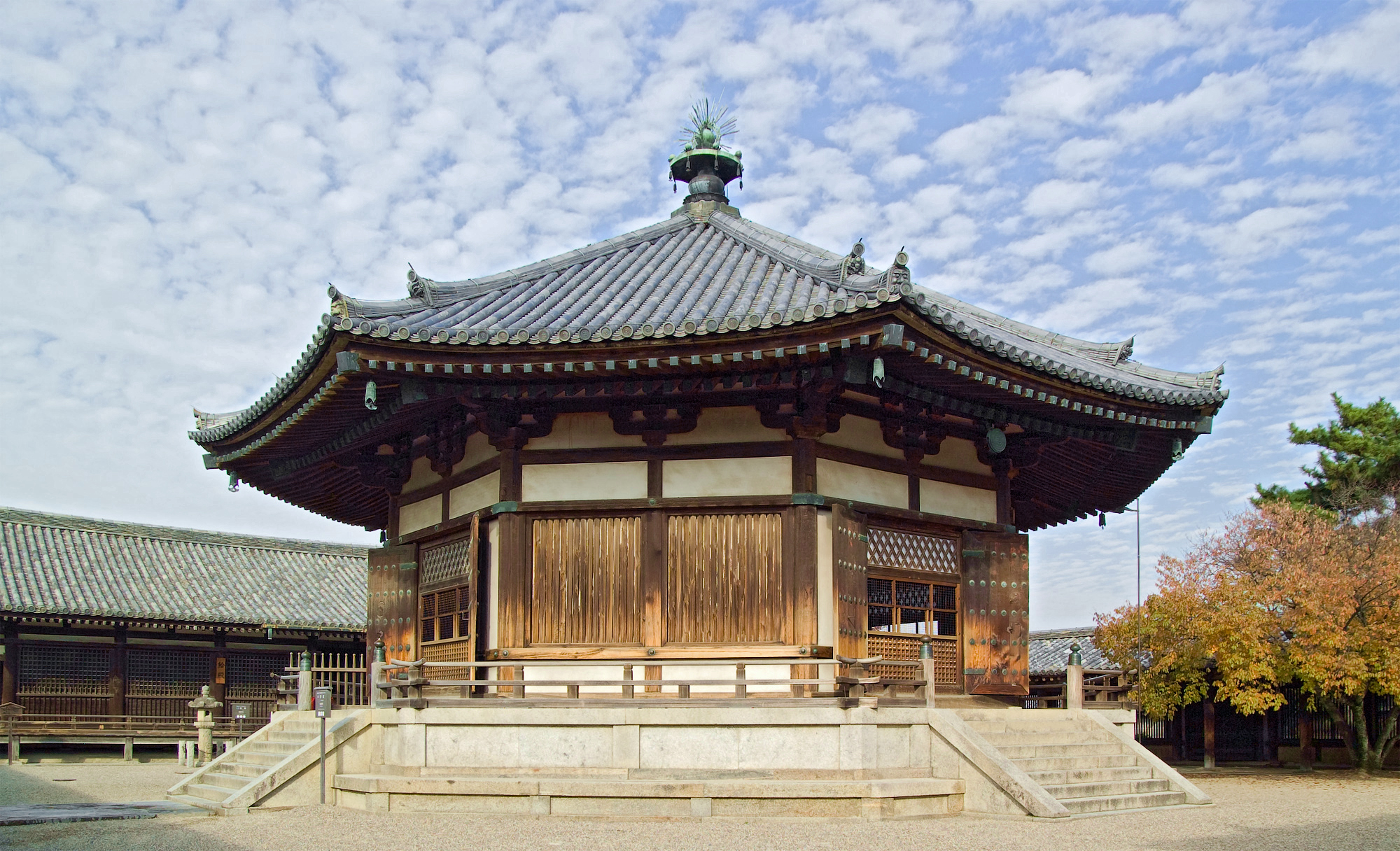
Yumedono, a hall associated with Prince Shōtoku

=== Yumedono (Hall of Dreams) ===
Yumedono (夢殿; Japanese pronunciation: [jɯ.me.do.no]) is one of the main constructions in the Tō-in area, built on the ground which was once Prince Shōtoku's private palace, Ikaruga no miya. The present incarnation of this hall was built in 739 to assuage the Prince's spirit. The hall acquired its present-day common name in the Heian period, after a legend that says a Buddha arrived as Prince Shōtoku and meditated in a hall that existed here. The hall also contains the famous Yumedono Kannon (also Kuse-, or Guze Kannon); which is only displayed at certain times of the year.

== Treasures ==
The treasures of the temple are considered to be a time capsule of Buddhist art from the sixth and seventh century. Many of the frescoes, statues, and other pieces of art within the temple, as well as the architecture of the temple's buildings themselves show the strong cultural influence from China, Korea and India, as well as aspects of Buddhist practice in Japan.

The Tokyo National Museum holds over 300 objects which were donated to the Imperial Household by Hōryū-ji in 1878. Some of these items are on public display, and all are available for study as part of the museum's digital collection.

=== Kudara Kannon ===
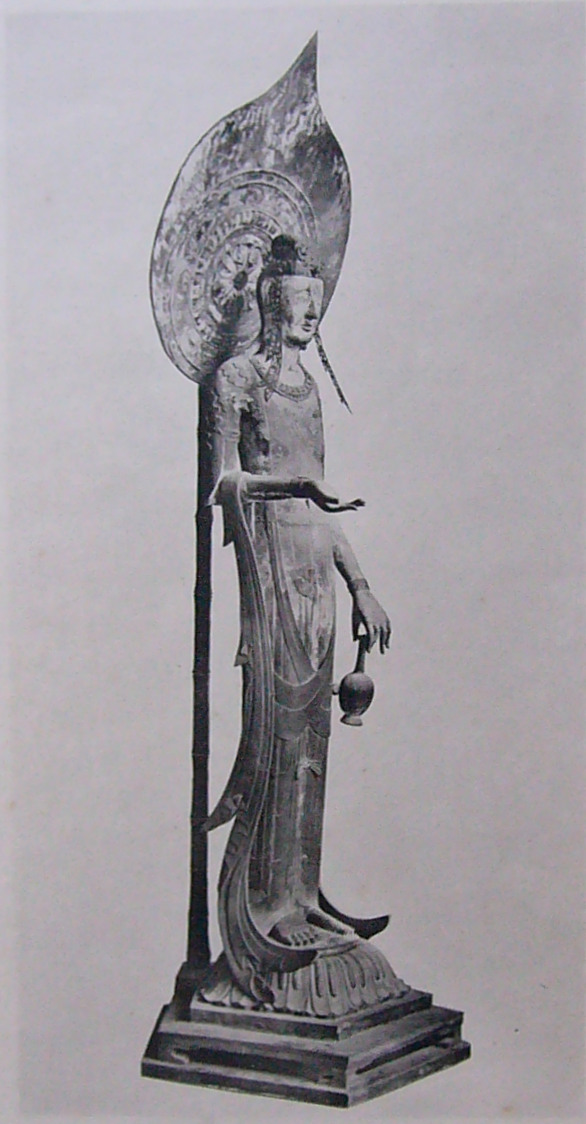
Kudara Kannon

The Kudara Kannon is one of the best representations of Buddhist sculpture from the Asuka period, along with the Guze Kannon in Yumedono. Likely made in the early to middle 7th century, it is 209 cm in height and has a slim figure. While frontality is a prominent characteristic of the Shaka Triad by Tori Busshi, the Kudara Kannon is intended to be viewed at an angle. It is mostly made of camphor. Some parts, such as its bare body, were finished with lacquer and colored vividly, but the lacquer has severely degraded over time.

The origin of the statue is unclear. It is not mentioned in ancient catalogs for Hōryūji's treasures, even ones written in the late Kamakura period. The first surviving record which references it was from 1698 CE and implies that it was moved from somewhere after the Kamakura period. The record calls it Kokūzō Bosatsu (Ākāśagarbha Bodhisattva), not Kannon Bosatsu (Guanyin), and says "it came from Baekje, but was made in India." From at least the Edo period, no official records remained about its origin.

Some modern-day investigations suggest that the statue was made in Japan during the Asuka period. The statue is carved from Camphora officinarum (a species of evergreen tree that is native to China south of the Yangtze River, Taiwan, southern Japan, Korea, India, and Vietnam), which was a typical medium for Japanese Buddhist sculptures in the 7th century. The base of the statue and the water bottle it holds are made of Japanese hinoki cypress, a species endemic to Japan. Furthermore, the style of flower ornaments in the crown closely resemble those of Guze Kannon and the Four Devas in the Kondō. Influences on this style could stem from the Northern Qi, Northern Zhou or Sui dynasties; however, the relative rarity of surviving Chinese Buddhist sculptures makes it difficult to pinpoint potential influences from China.

=== Murals ===
Amitabha paradise before fire

The murals of the kondō comprise fifty walls; four larger walls, eight mid-sized walls, and thirty-eight small walls inside the building. The original murals were removed after the 1949 fire and are kept in a non-public treasure house. Twenty small wall paintings, unscathed from the 1949 fire, are in their original places, while reproductions have replaced the damaged sections.

It is generally believed that the paintings on the large walls represent the Pure Land (浄土 jōdo) with Shaka, Amida, Miroku and Yakushi Nyorai Buddhas. Some of the artistic choices, including the way the robes are modeled, are similar to murals found in Ajanta Caves (India) or Dunhuang (China). Also observed are Tang and Indian variants of the Bosatsu and Kannon drawn on the sides of the Amida.

Judging from the early Tang influences, contemporary consensus is that the murals were created at the end of the 7th century. This ruled out some 7th-century figures as its creator, such as Tori or Donchō, and there is currently no widely accepted artist for the murals.

=== Shaka Triad ===
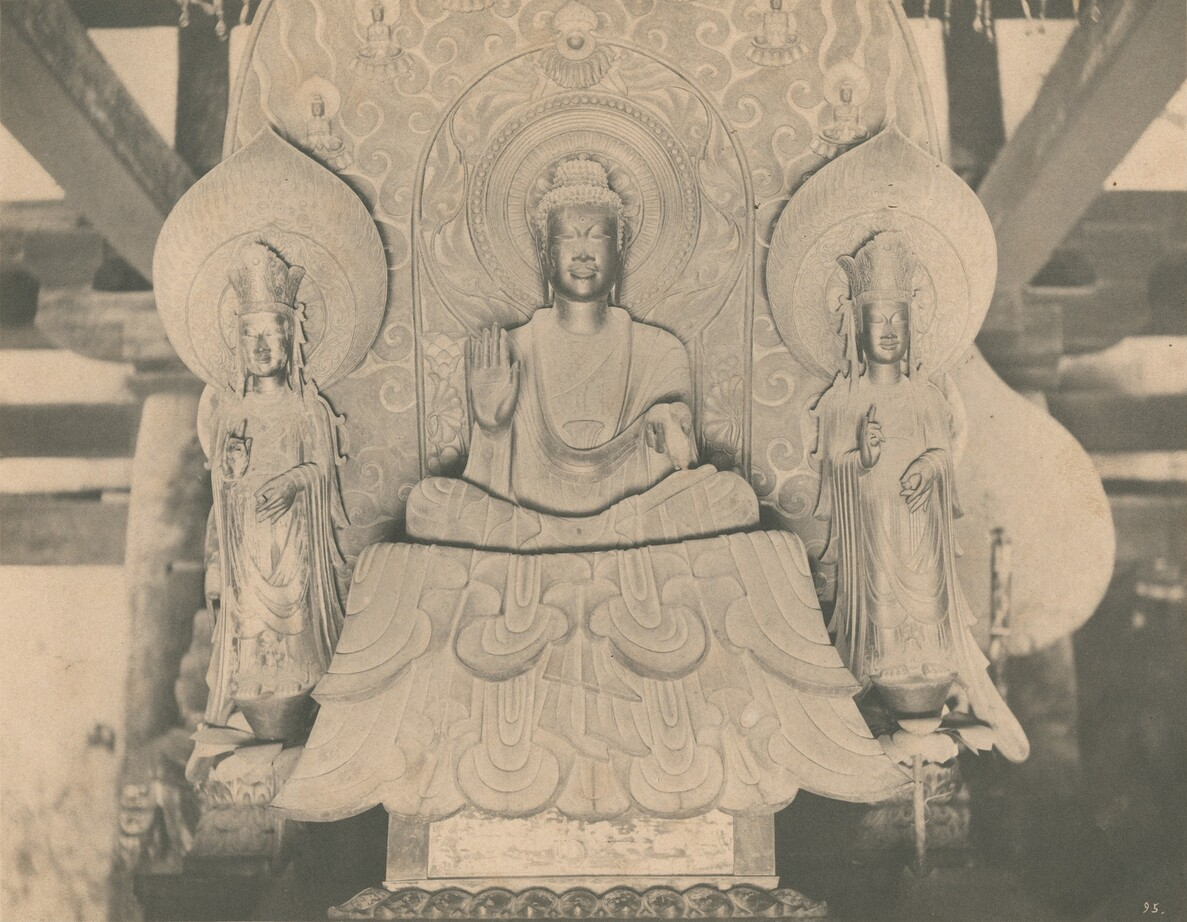
Shaka Triad

The Shaka Triad is a large cast bronze statue credited to Tori Busshi. It depicts Sakyamuni, the center Buddha, attended by two other figures, Bhaisajyaguru to its right and Amitābha to its left. The statues are dated to 623 and the style originates in Northern Wei art. The style is also known as Tori style and is characterized by the two-dimensionality of the figure and the repetitive pattern-like depictions of the cloth the triad sits upon. At each corner of the triad stand four wooden Shitennō statues from the end of the Asuka period. They are the oldest examples of Shitennō statues in Japan.

=== Tamamushi Shrine ===
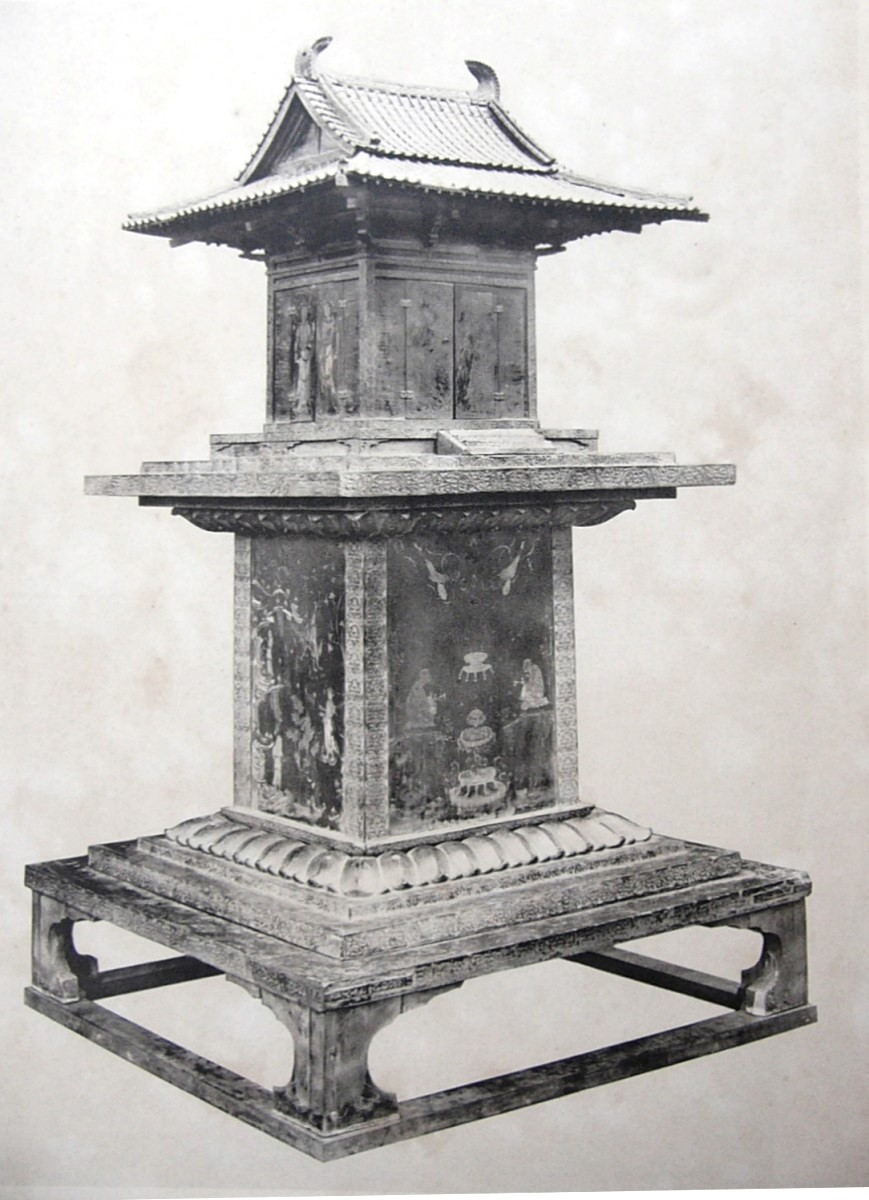
The Tamamushi Shrine, Tamamushi-no-zushi, a miniature shrine once decorated with the iridescent wings of the tamamushi beetle (Chrysochroa fulgidissima)

The Tamamushi Shrine is a small wooden Buddhist shrine that is currently stored in the Great Treasure Repository of Hōryū-ji. The shrine is named for the many wings of the tamamushi beetle that once adorned it but have since deteriorated. The shrine was likely created before the year 693, possibly predating Hōryū-ji's construction. It is notable for its smallness (it measures only 226 centimeters in height) and for being the oldest surviving shrine of its kind in East Asia. The paintings that cover building and dais are of Jataka tales, bodhisattvas, the Four Heavenly Kings, and other buddhist iconography.

The front panels of the building show the Four Guardian Kings clad in armor with long flowing scarves. On the side doors are bodhisattvas holding lotus blossoms and forming a mudra. The back depicts a sacred landscape with heights topped with pagodas. On the dais, the front depicts relics, seated monks making offerings, and apsara. The back of the dais depicts Mount Sumeru, and the right side shows a scene from the Nirvana Sutra, where the Buddha offers his life in return for more of the sacred teachings, before being caught in his plummet by Indra. On the left side is a scene from the Golden Light Sutra of a bodhisattva removing his upper garments before casting himself from a cliff to feed a hungry tigress and her cubs.

=== Yakushi Nyorai ===
The statue of Yakushi of the original temple was saved during the fire of 670. While the temple was being rebuilt the Shaka Triad was commissioned or had been already cast.

=== Yumedono (Guze) Kannon ===
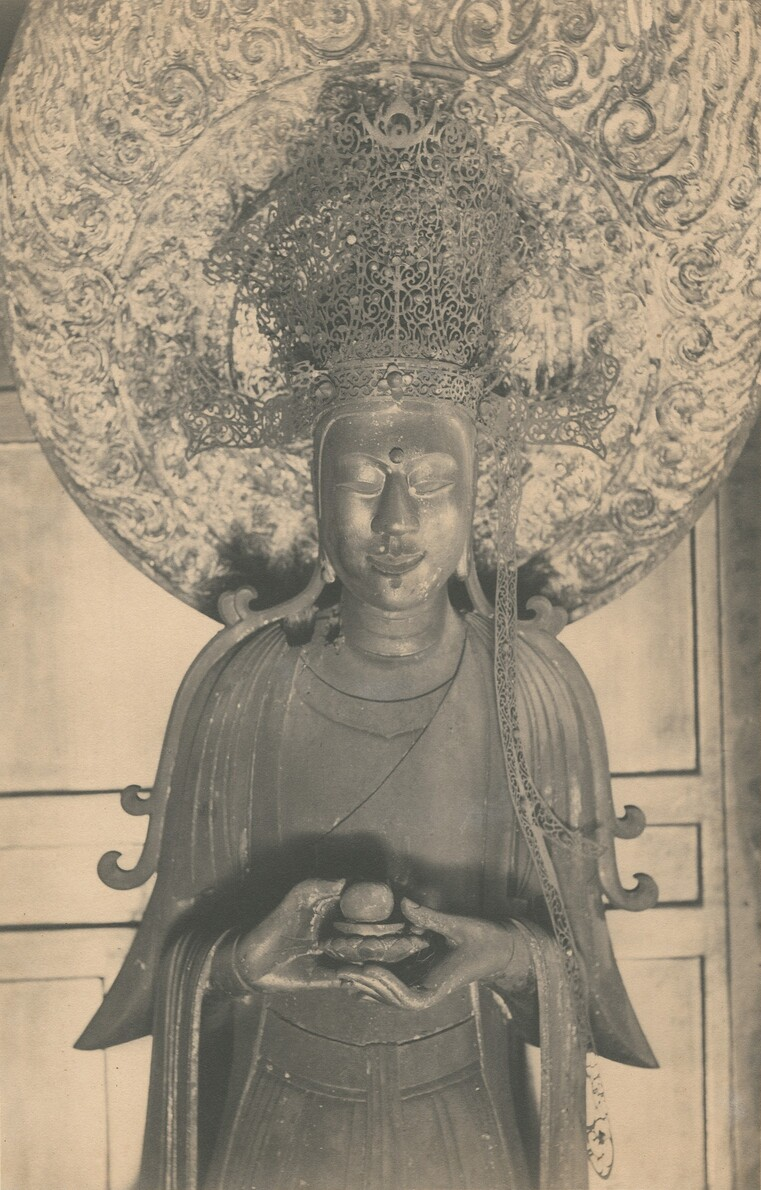
Yumedono Kannon

The Yumedono Kannon is a statue made of gilded wood. It is in superb condition because it was kept in the Dream Hall, wrapped in five hundred meters of cloth, and never viewed in sunlight. The statue was considered sacred and was never seen until it was unwrapped at the demand of Ernest Fenollosa, who was charged by the Japanese government to catalogue the art of the country. Art historians suggest that this figure is based on the Tori Busshi style.

The Yumedono Kannon supposedly represents Prince Shotoku. It is 197 centimeters in height, and some sources believe that Shotoku was that height. It is suggested that the statue was made to assuage the dead prince's spirit because the halo was attached to the statue by a nail driven through the head. The statue bears a close resemblance to extant portraiture of the prince.

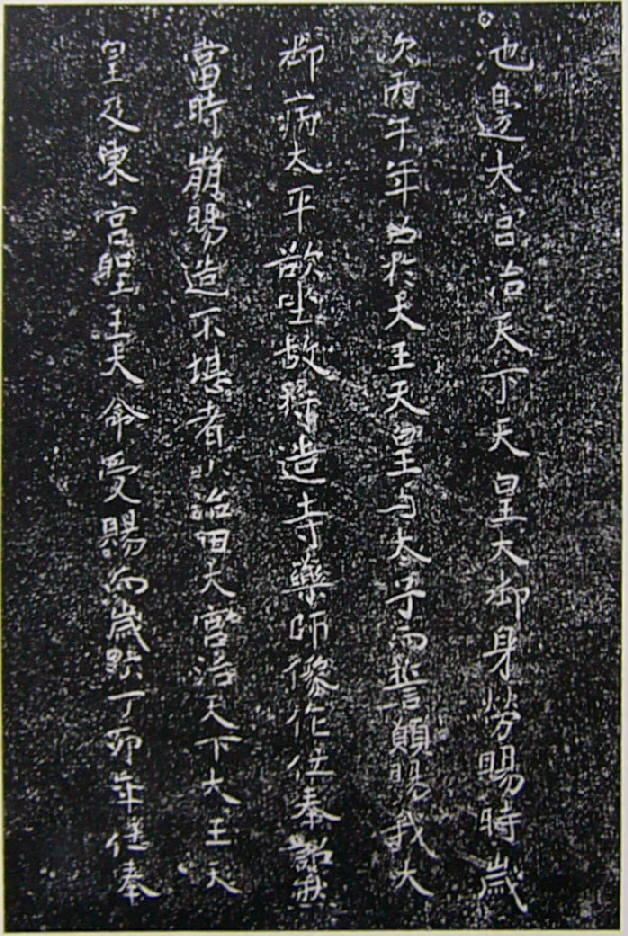
Inscription on the halo of Bhaisajyaguru

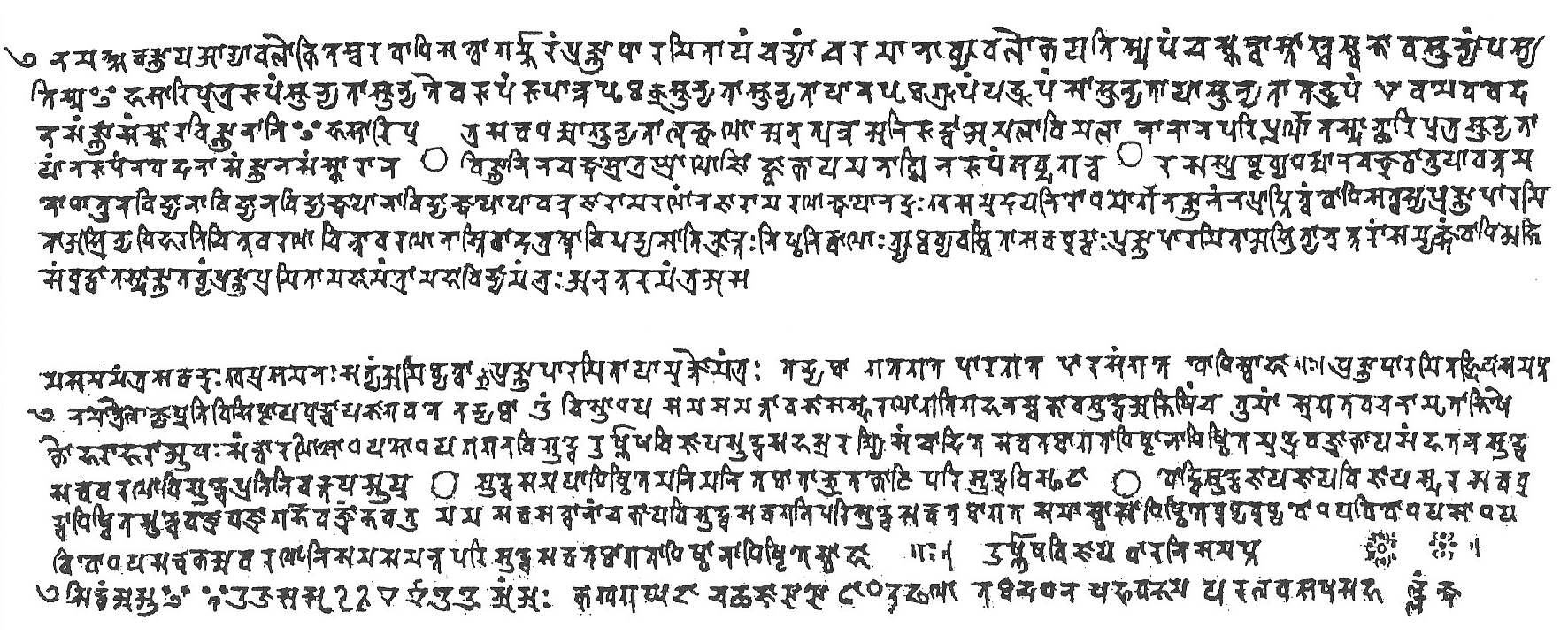
A replica of The Heart Sutra and Uṣṇīṣa Vijaya Dhāraṇī Sūtra manuscript in Siddham script on palm-leaf in 609 CE. First page and the first line of second page is The Heart Sutra second page is Uṣṇīṣa Vijaya Dhāraṇī Sūtra Hōryū-ji, Japan. The last line is a complete Sanskrit syllabary in Siddhaṃ script.

== Serving the needs of architectural research ==
The Nihon Shoki records the arrival of a carpenter and a buddhist sculptor in 577, along with the monks, from Baekje to Japan in order to build temples locally. These experts are recorded to have stationed in Naniwa, or present-day Osaka, where the Shitennō-ji was built.

There is no record, on the other hand, as to who exactly were the people that have engaged in the construction of Hōryū-ji, although the Nihon Shoki records the existence of 46 temples in 624. The bracket work of Hōryū-ji resembles that of the partial remainder of a miniature Baekje gilt bronze pagoda.

== Gallery ==
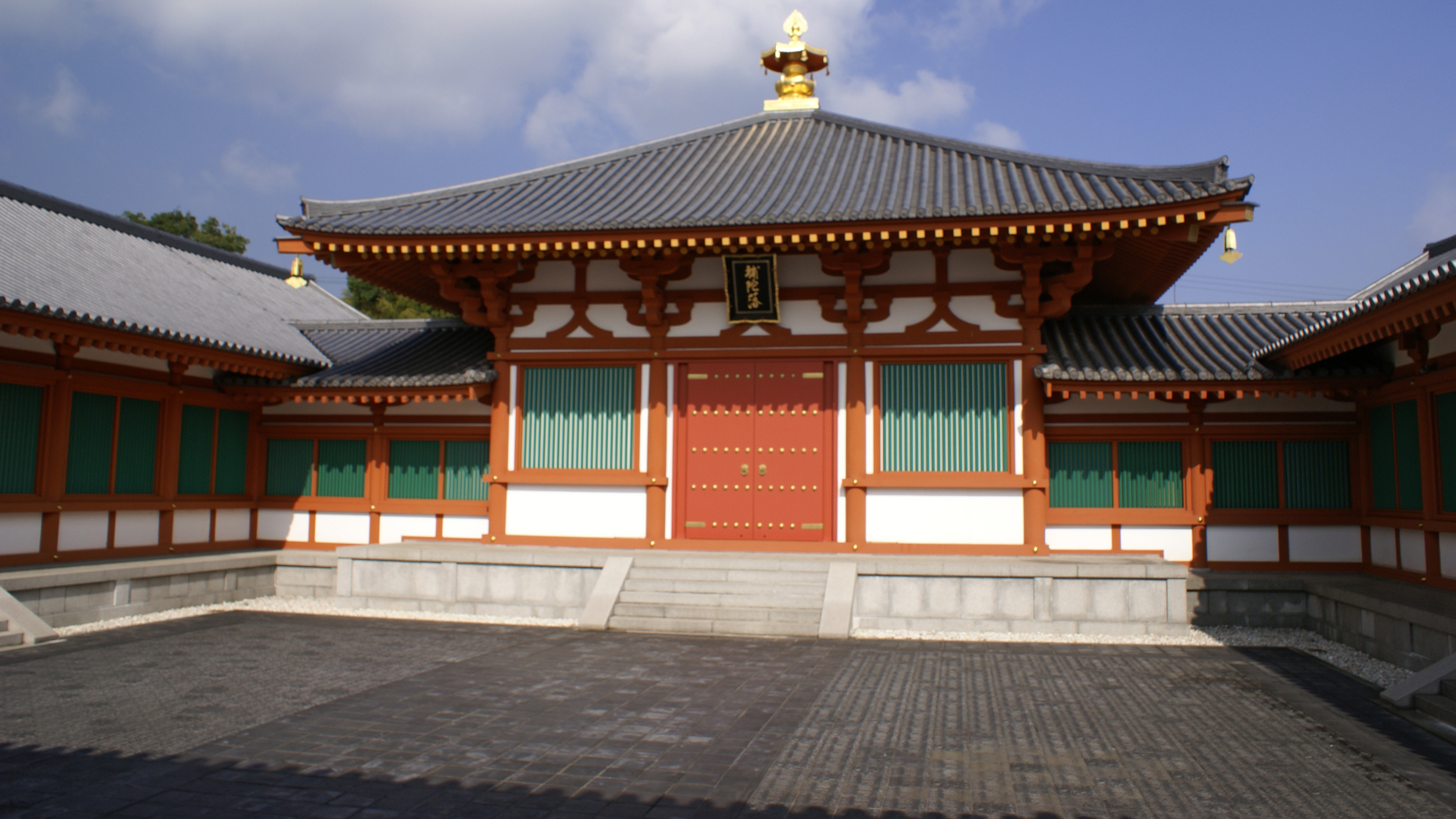
Kudarakan'nondō

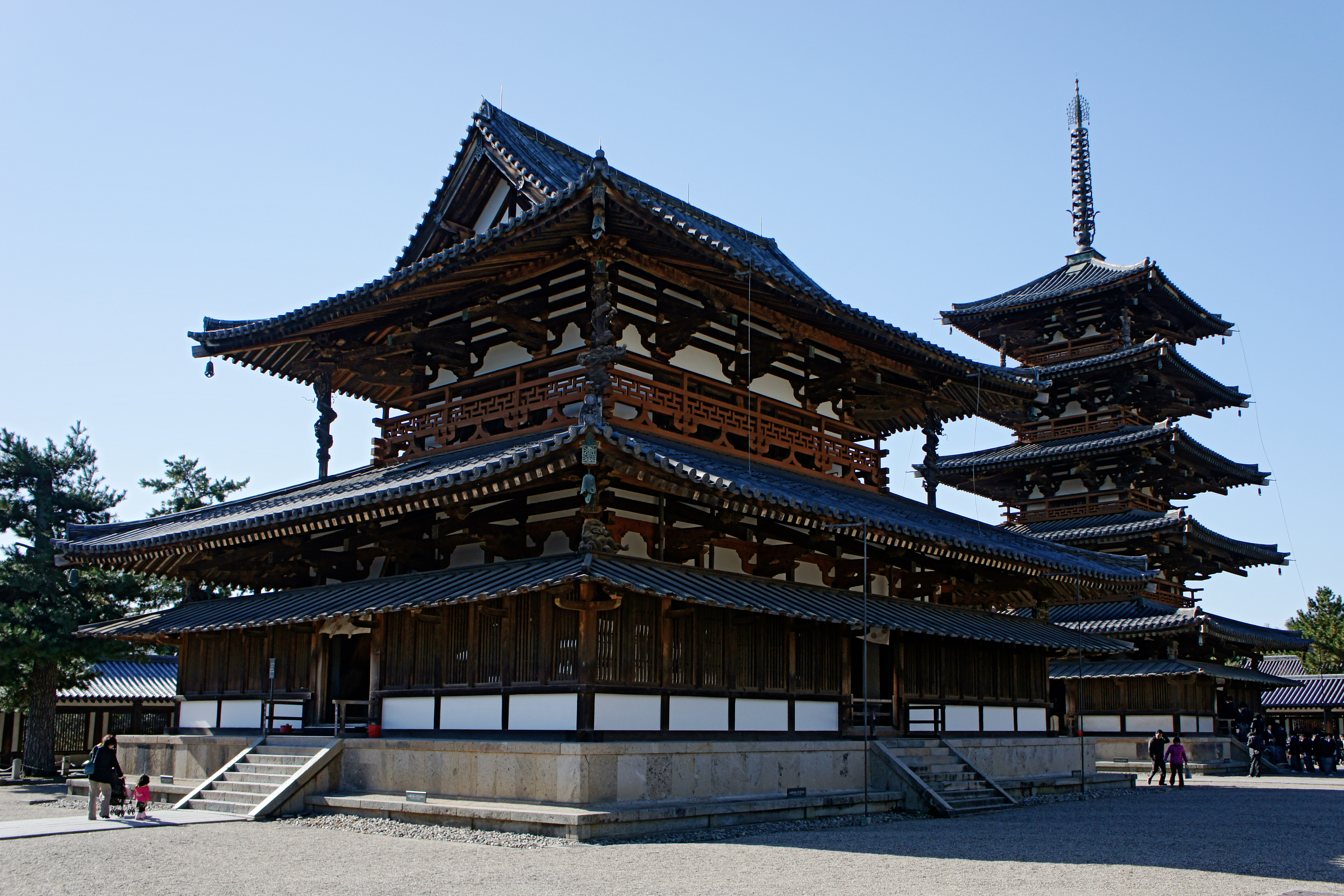
Kondō and pagoda

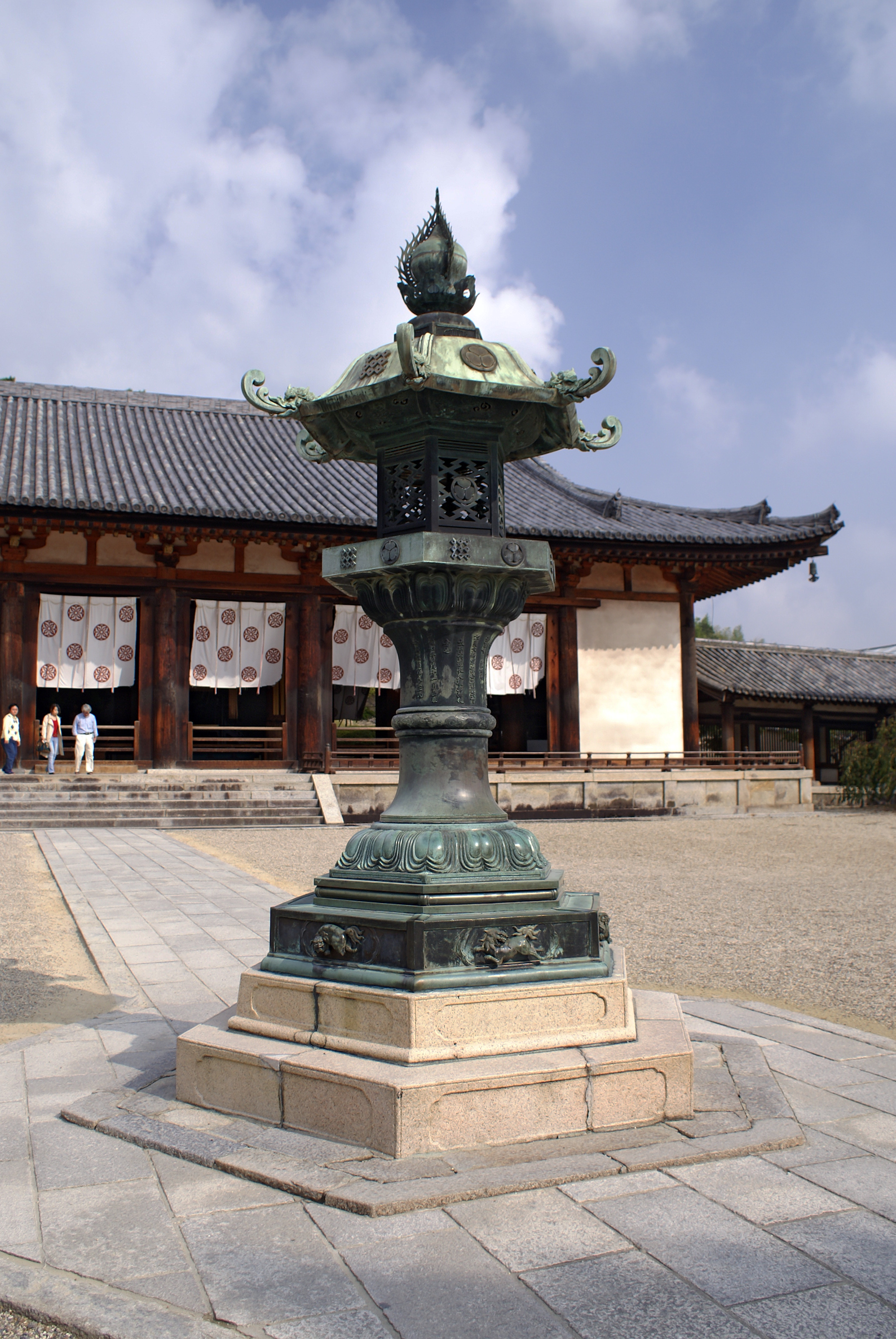
Bronze lantern

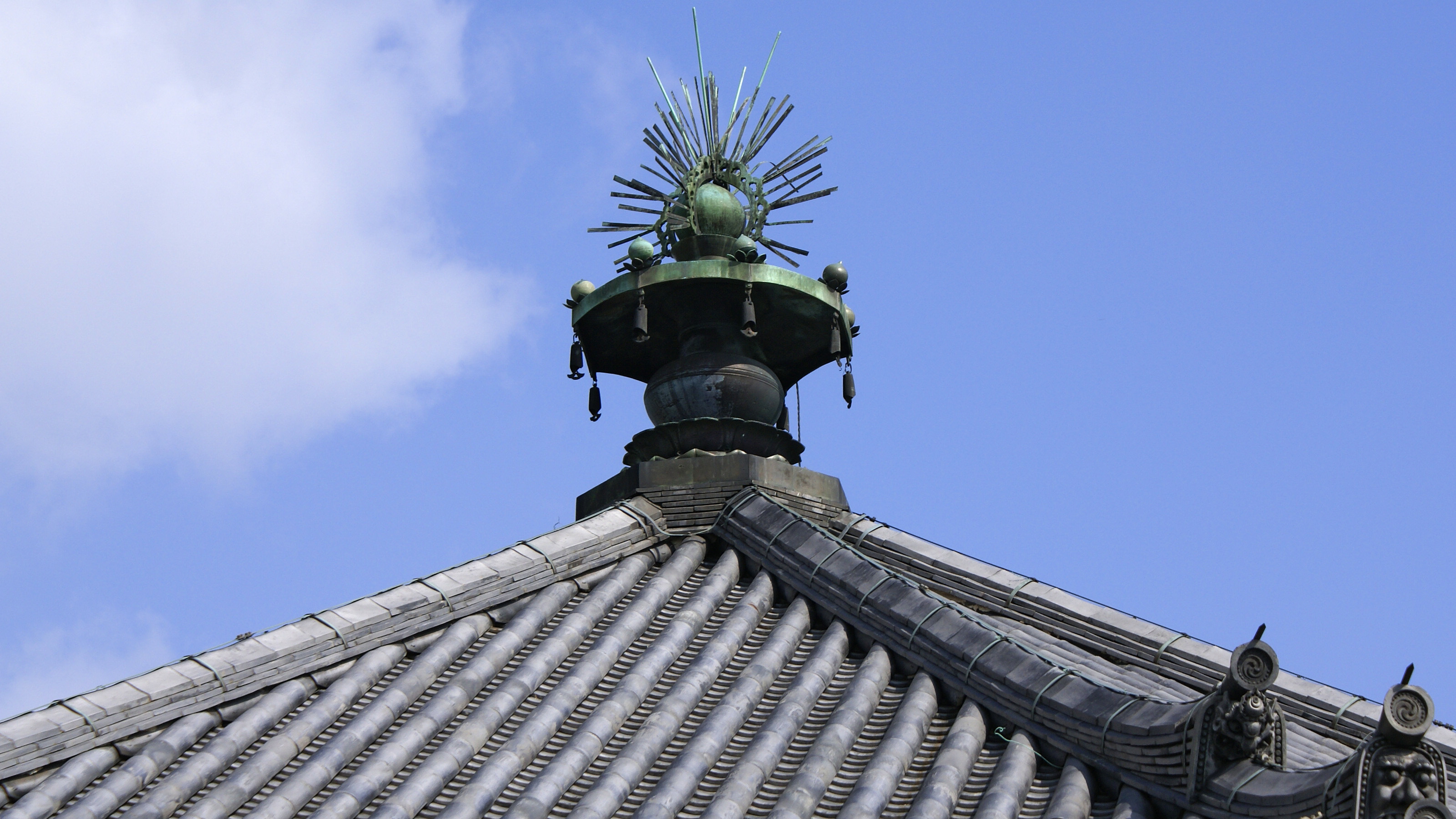
Yumedono roof decoration

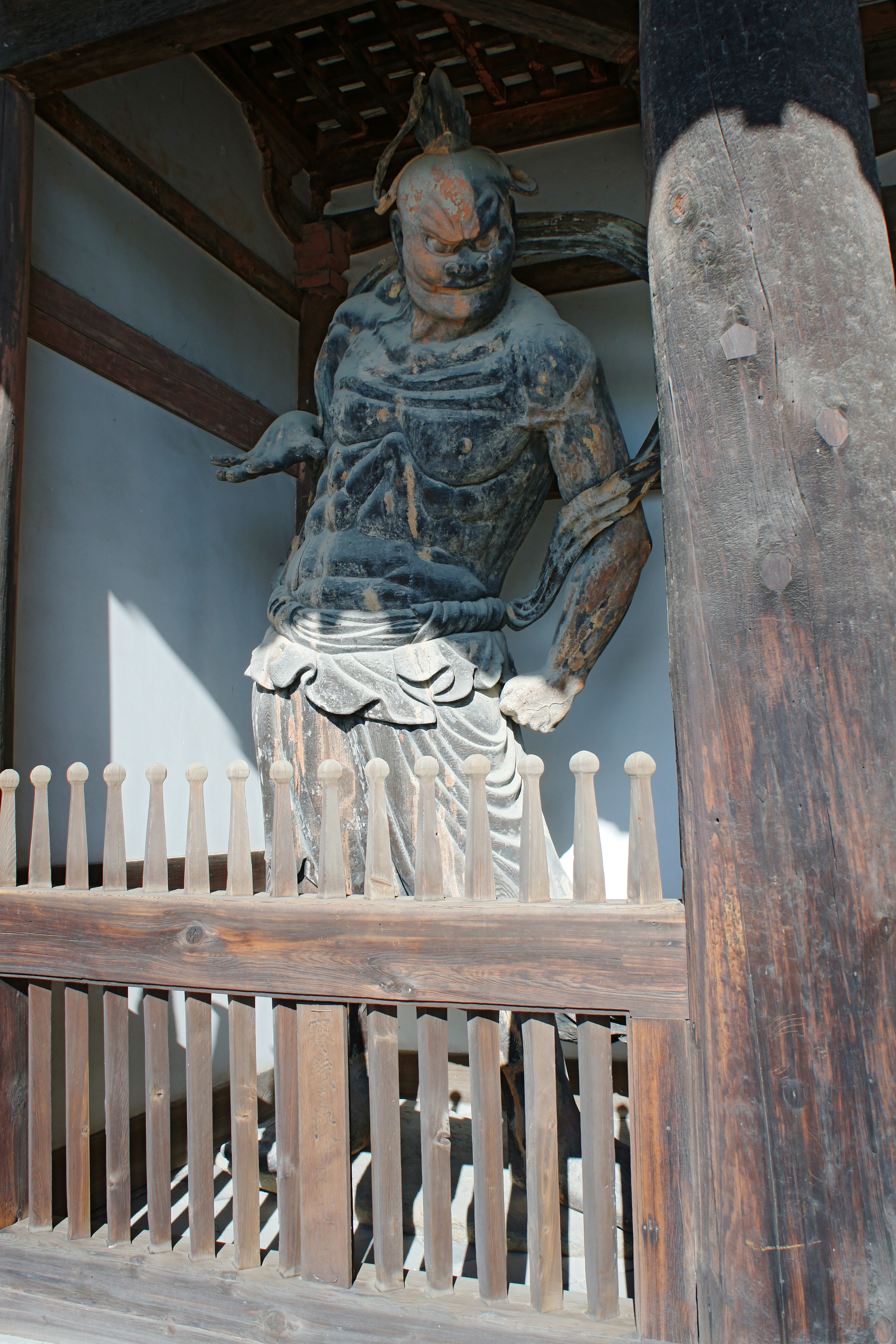
Guardian statue

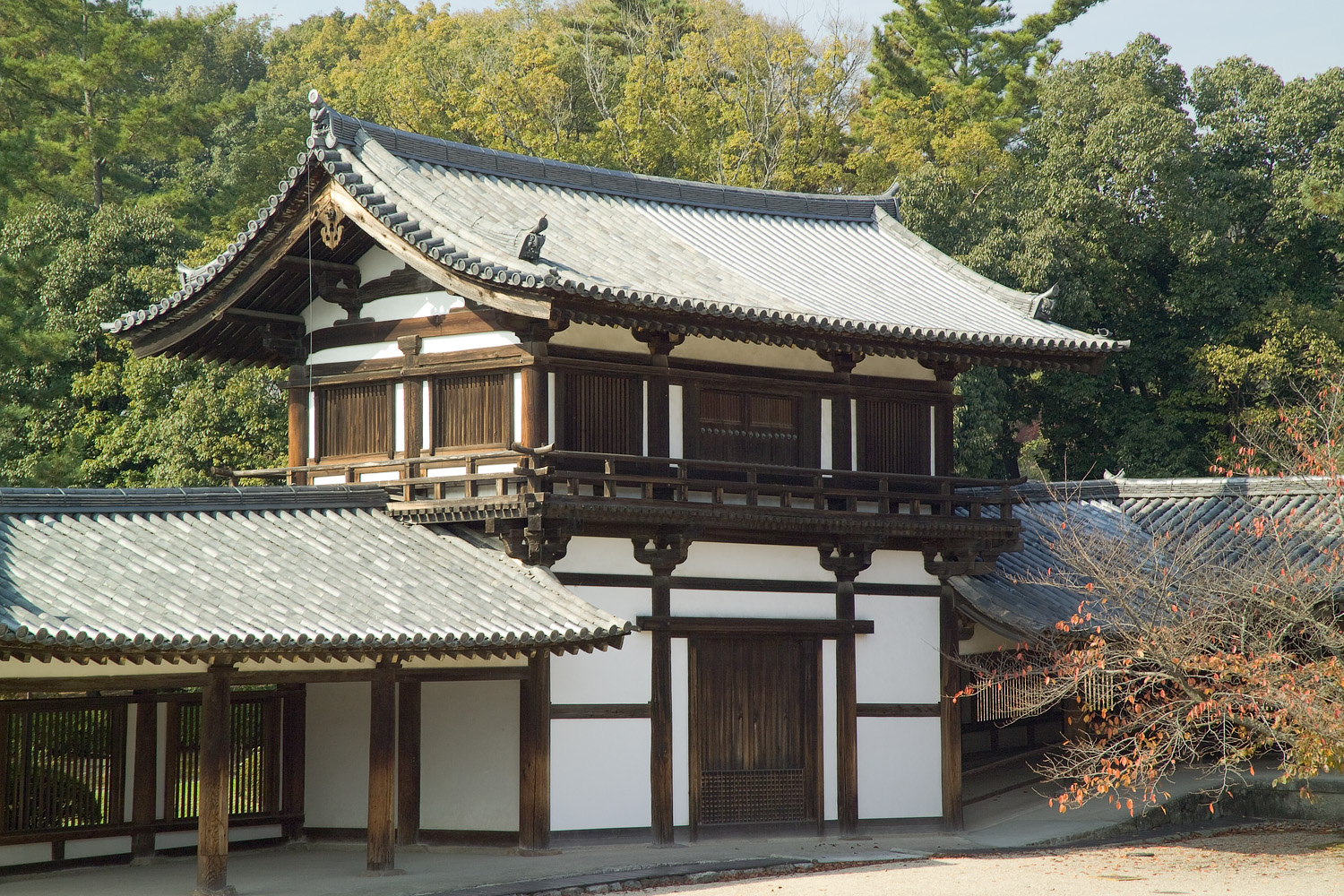

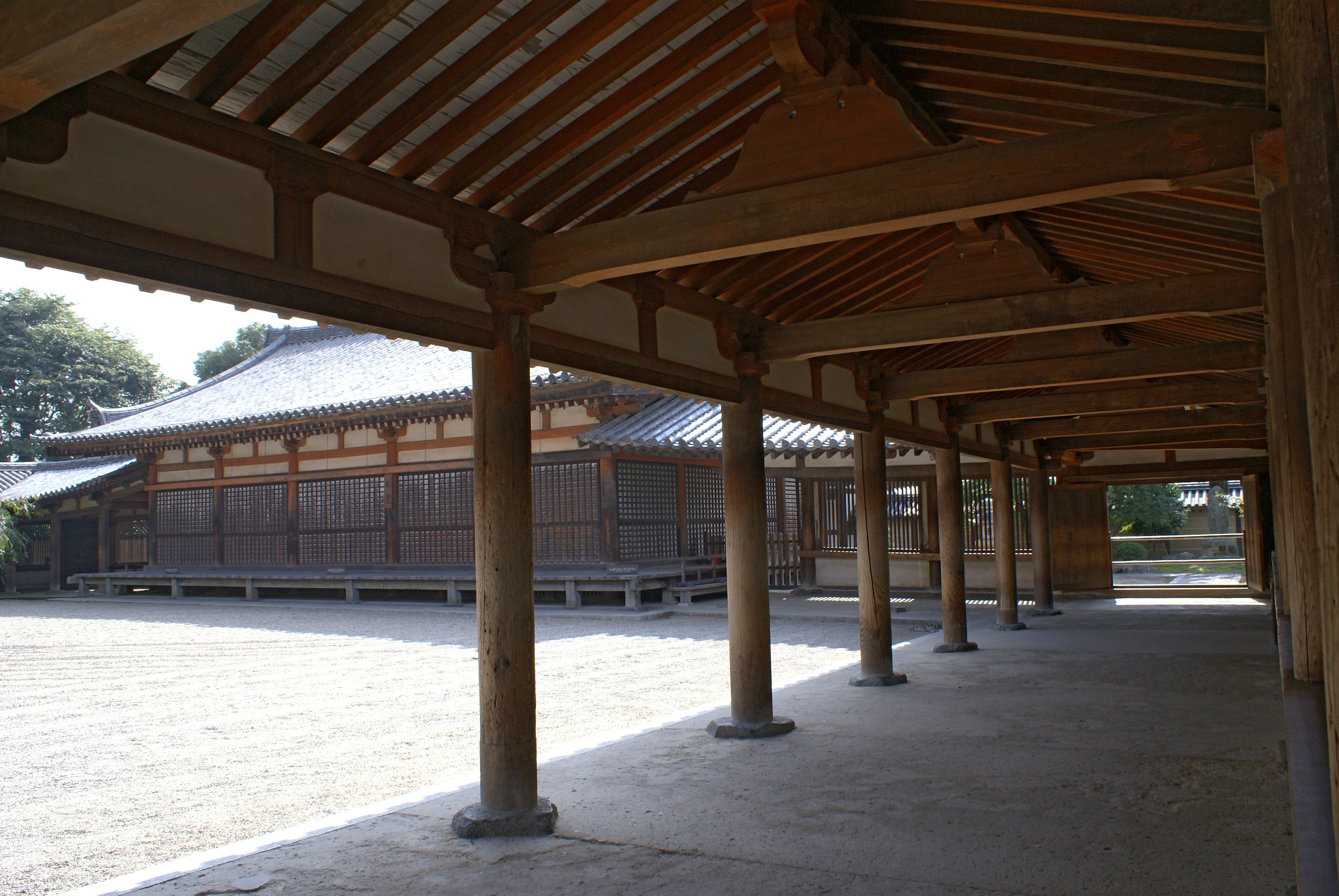
Reidō and the Cloister of Toin

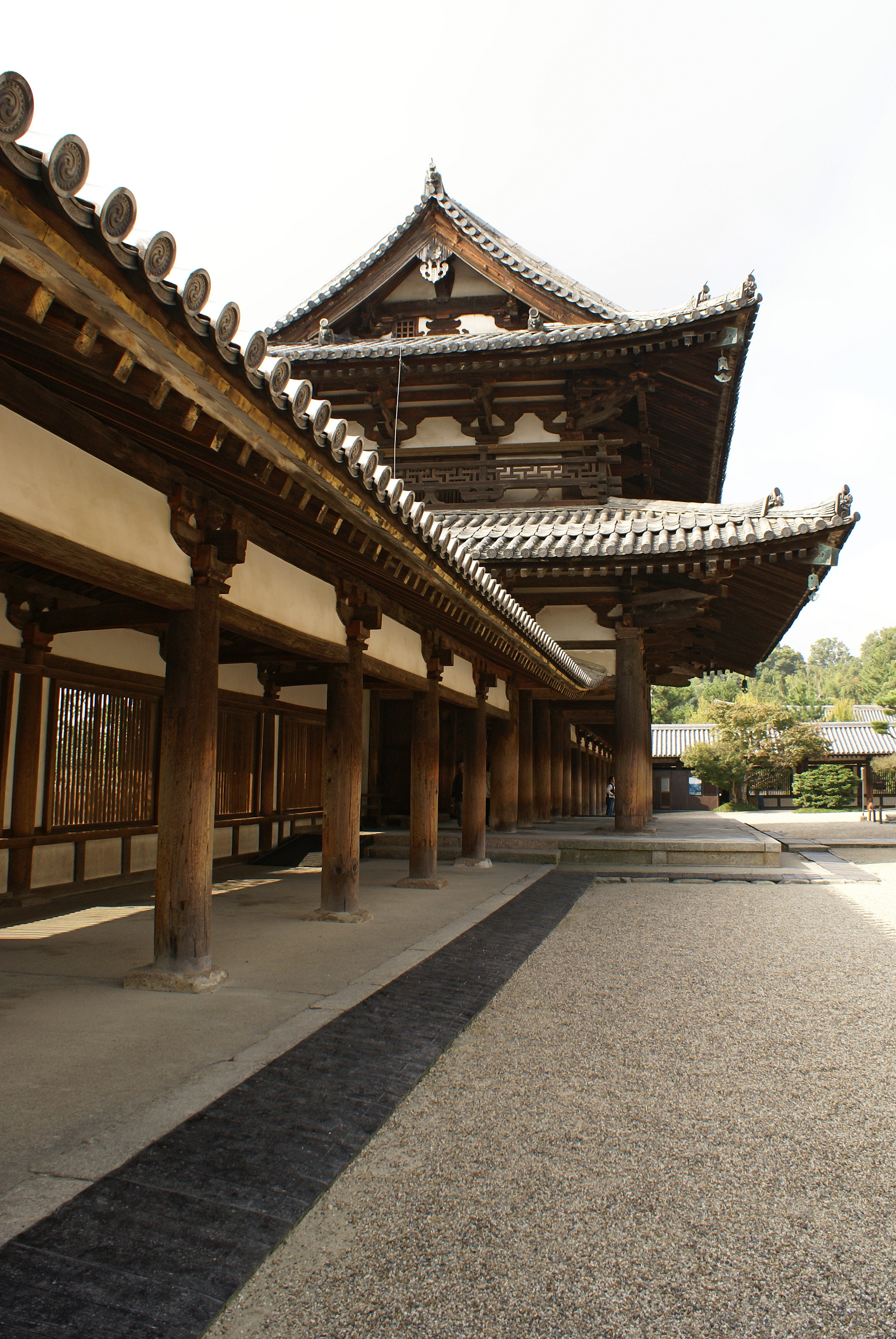

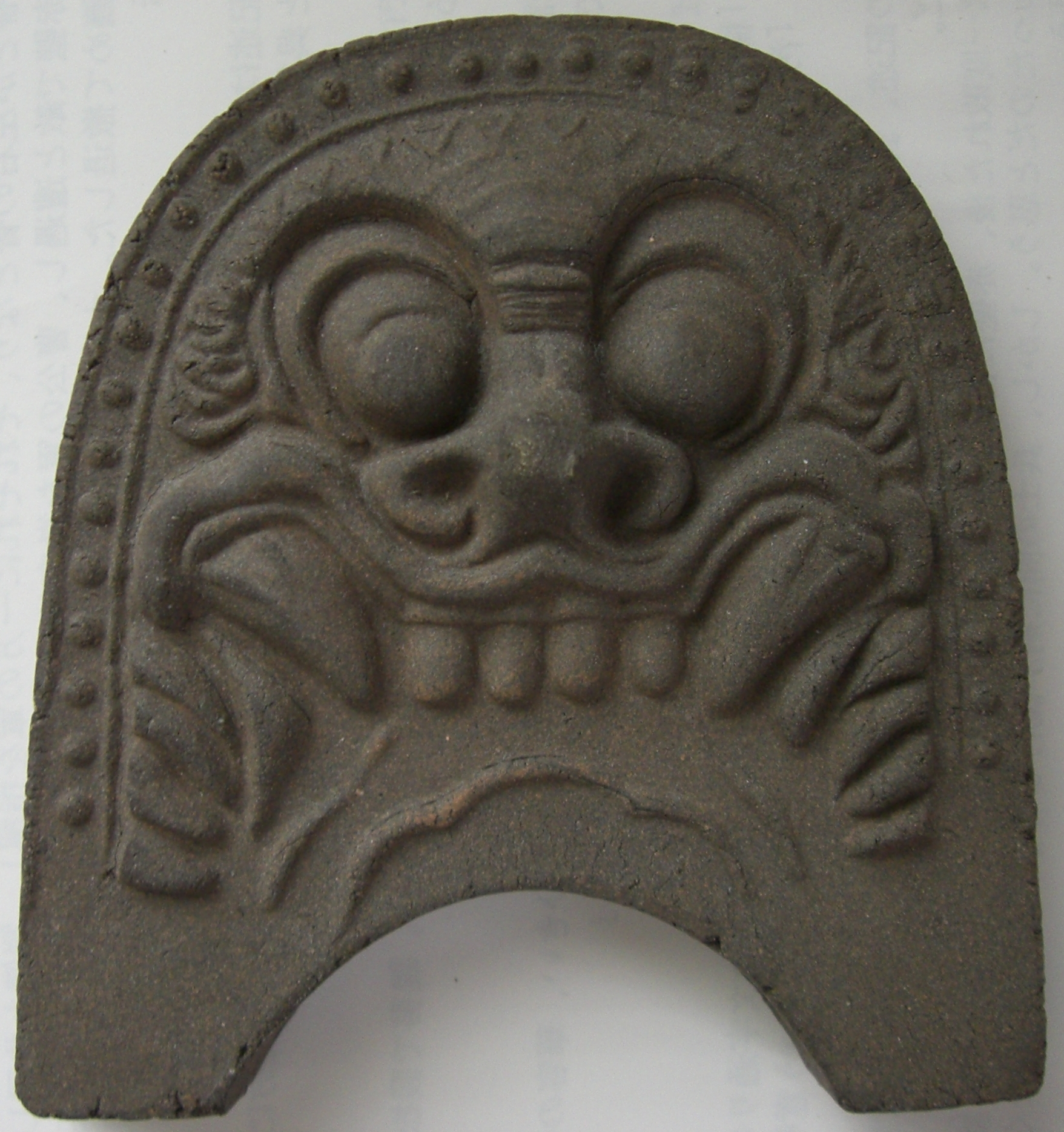
Onigawara roof tile

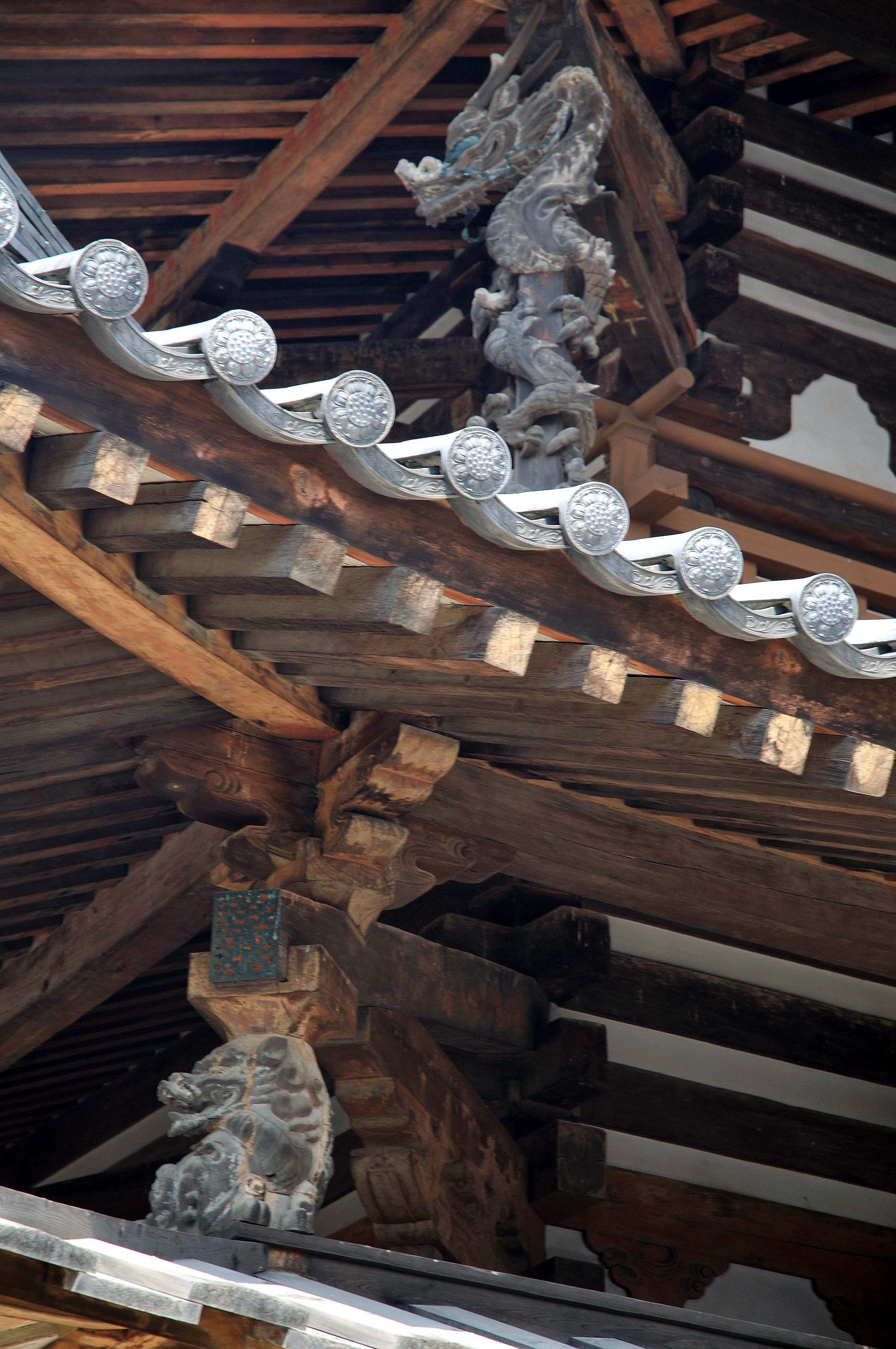
Dragon ornaments on the roof

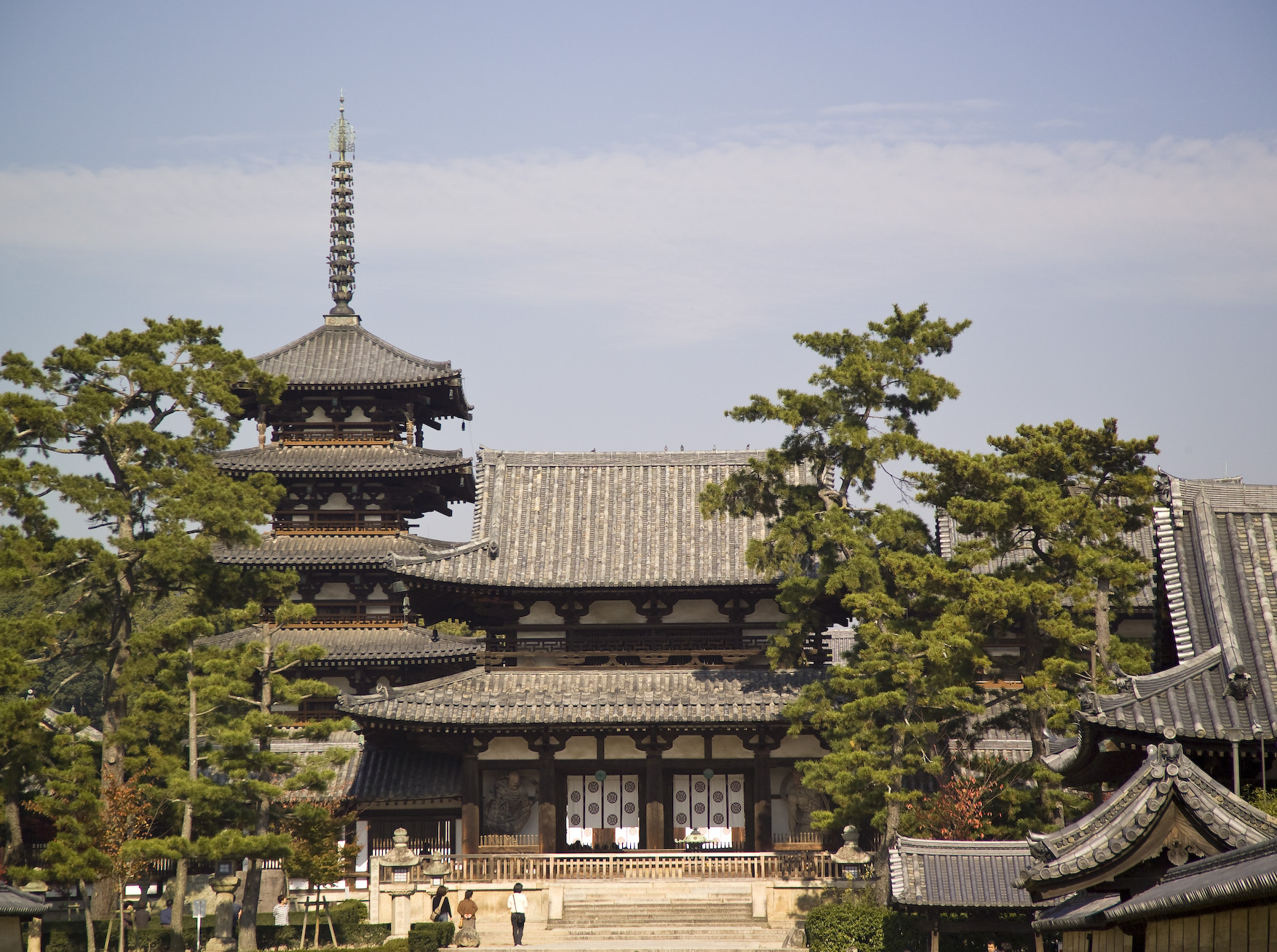
The Horyu-ji complex

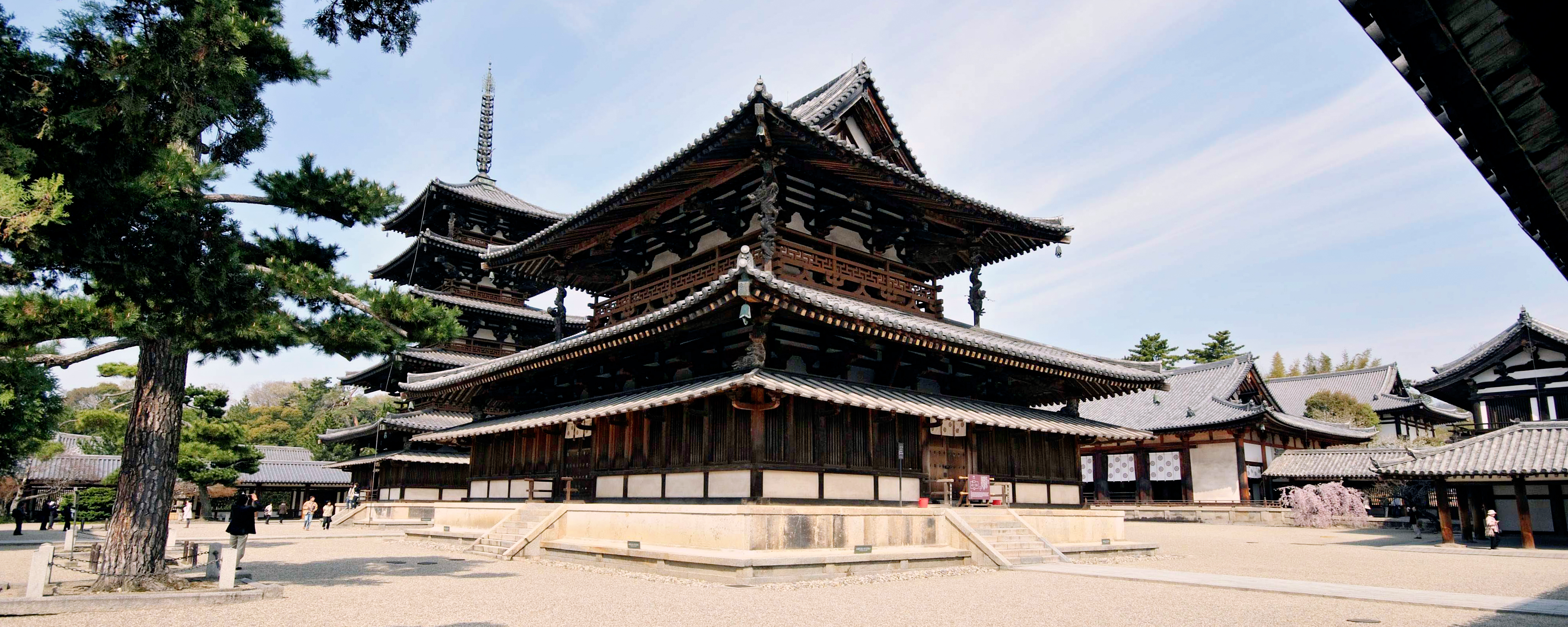
Panoramic view

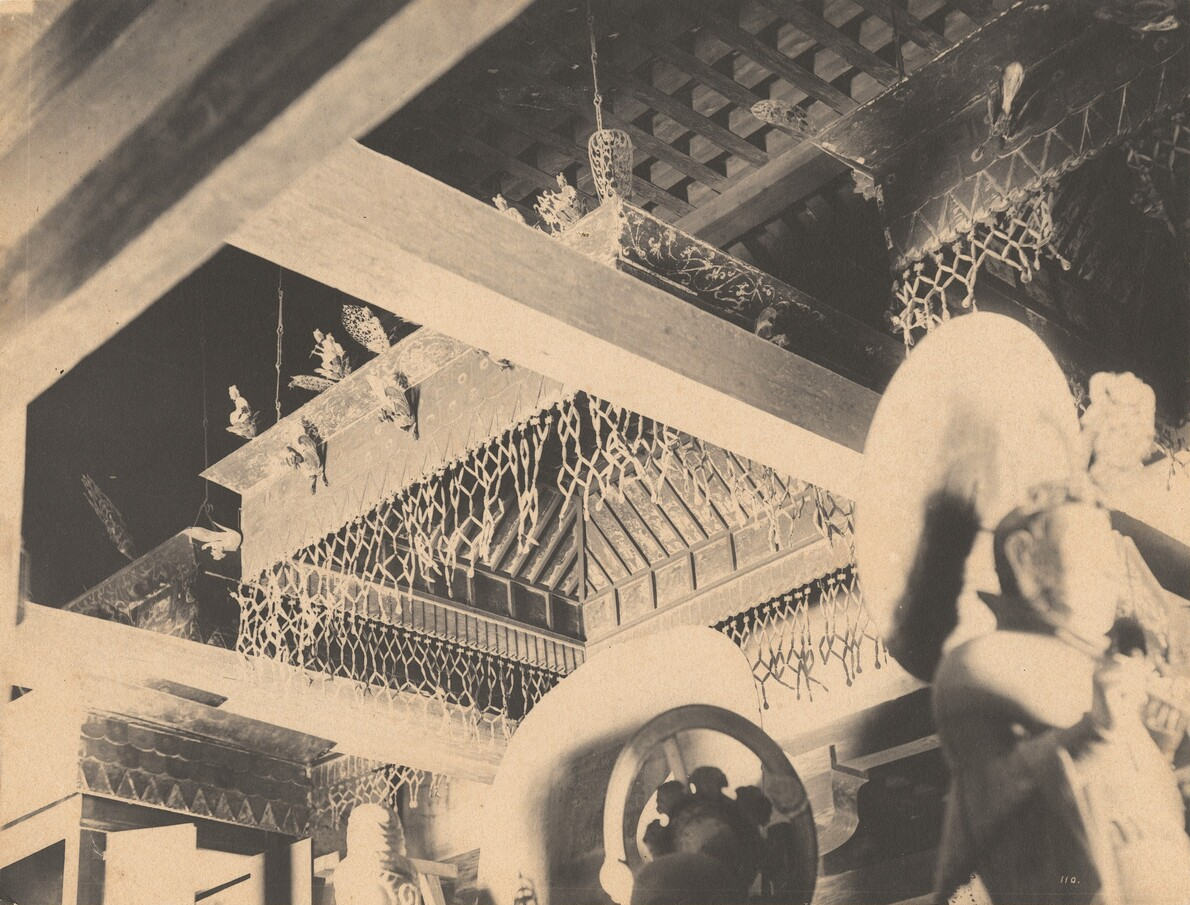
Tengai canopy of Kondō

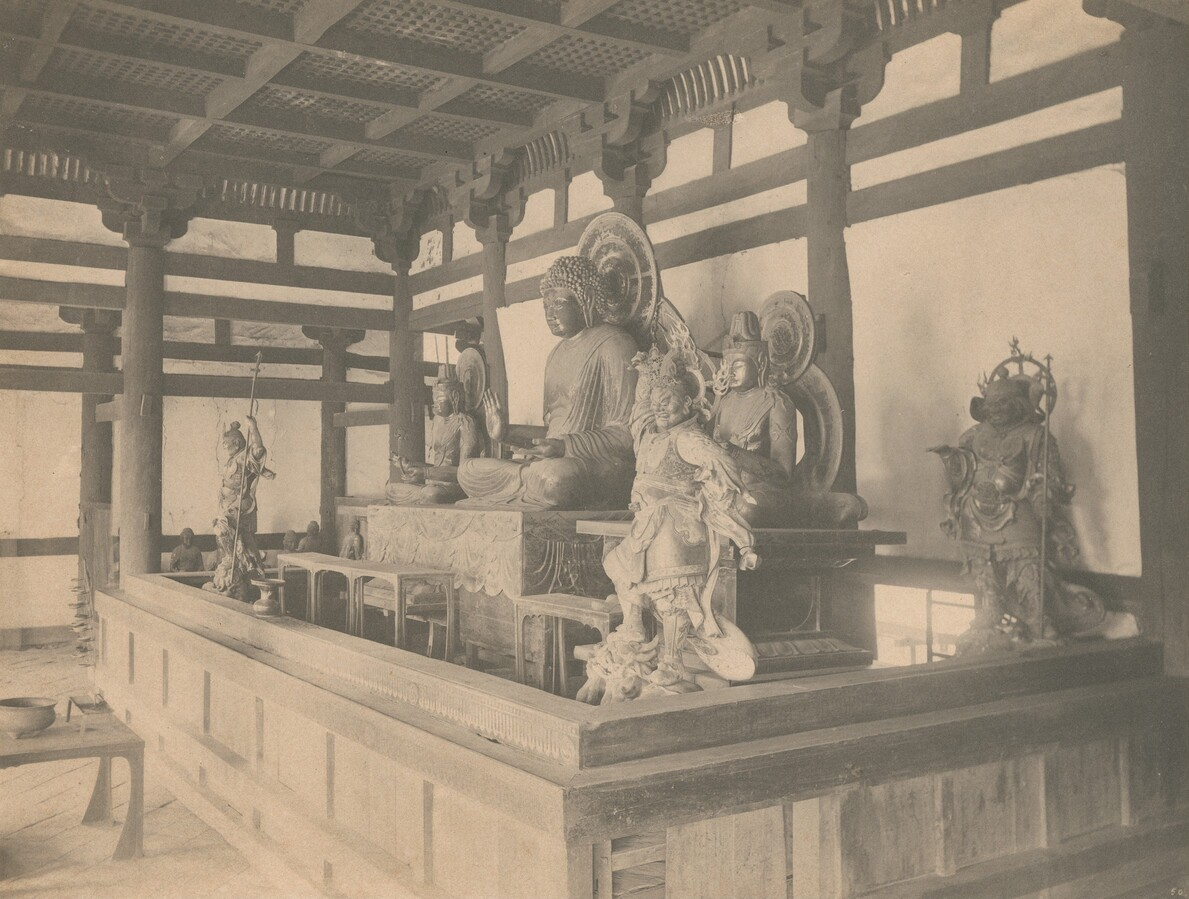
Shaka Triad with Shitenno

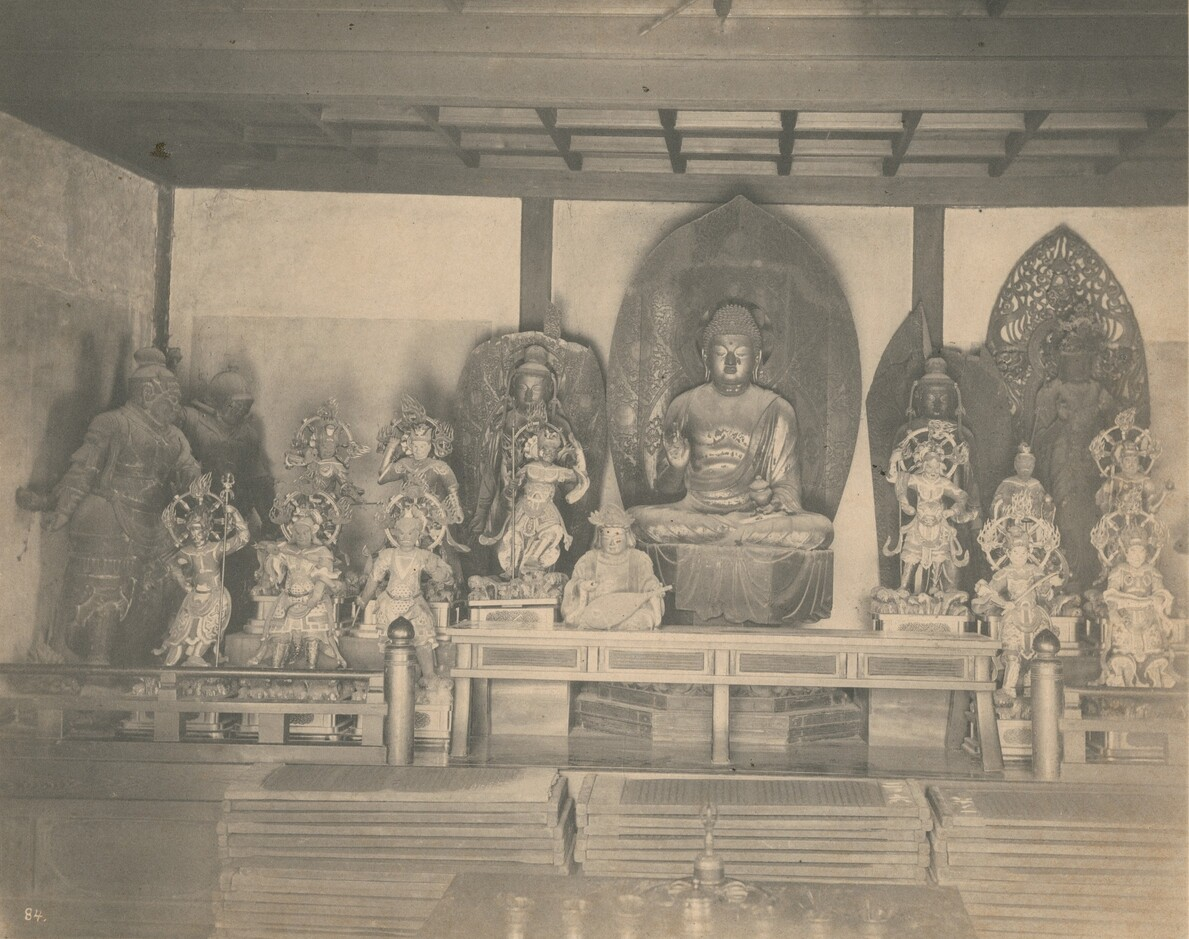
Yakushi Triad with Statues

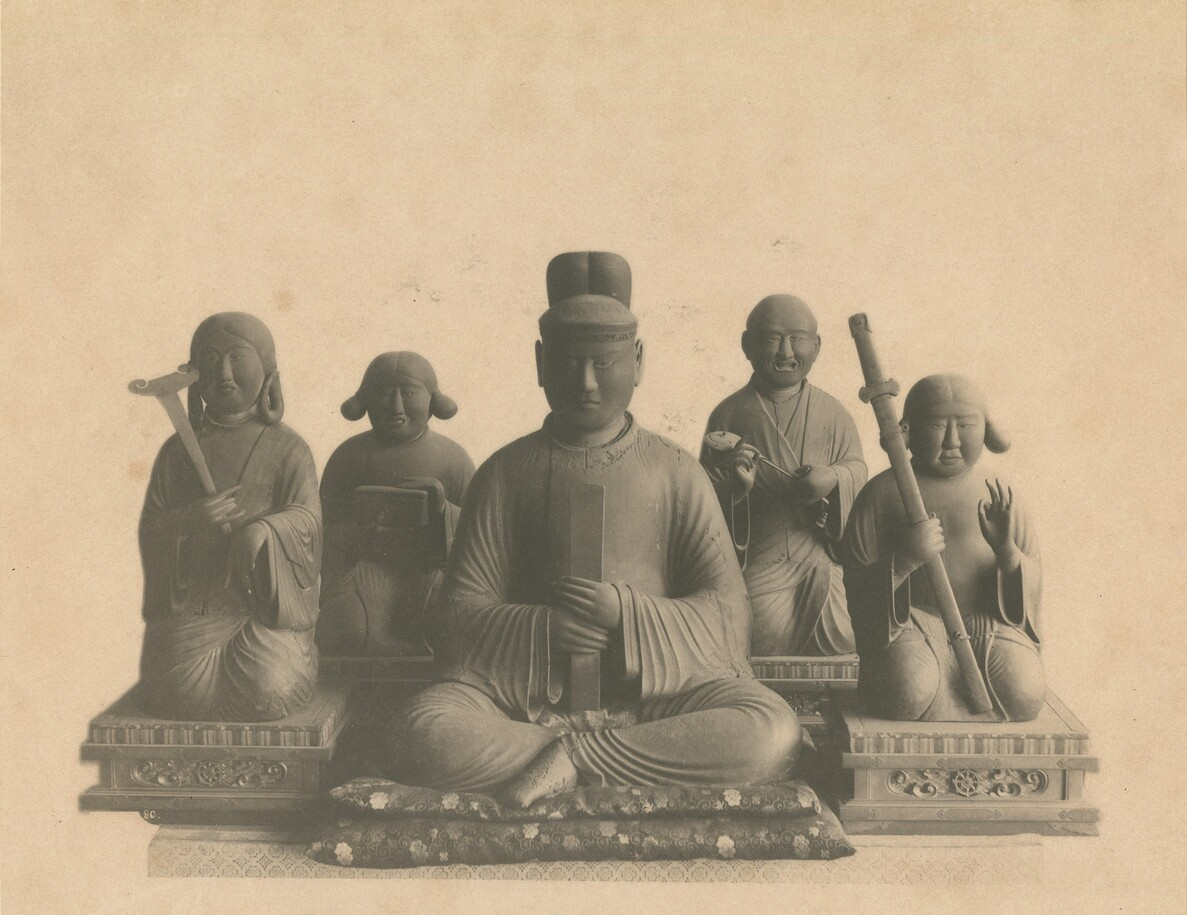
Prince Shotoku and Attendants

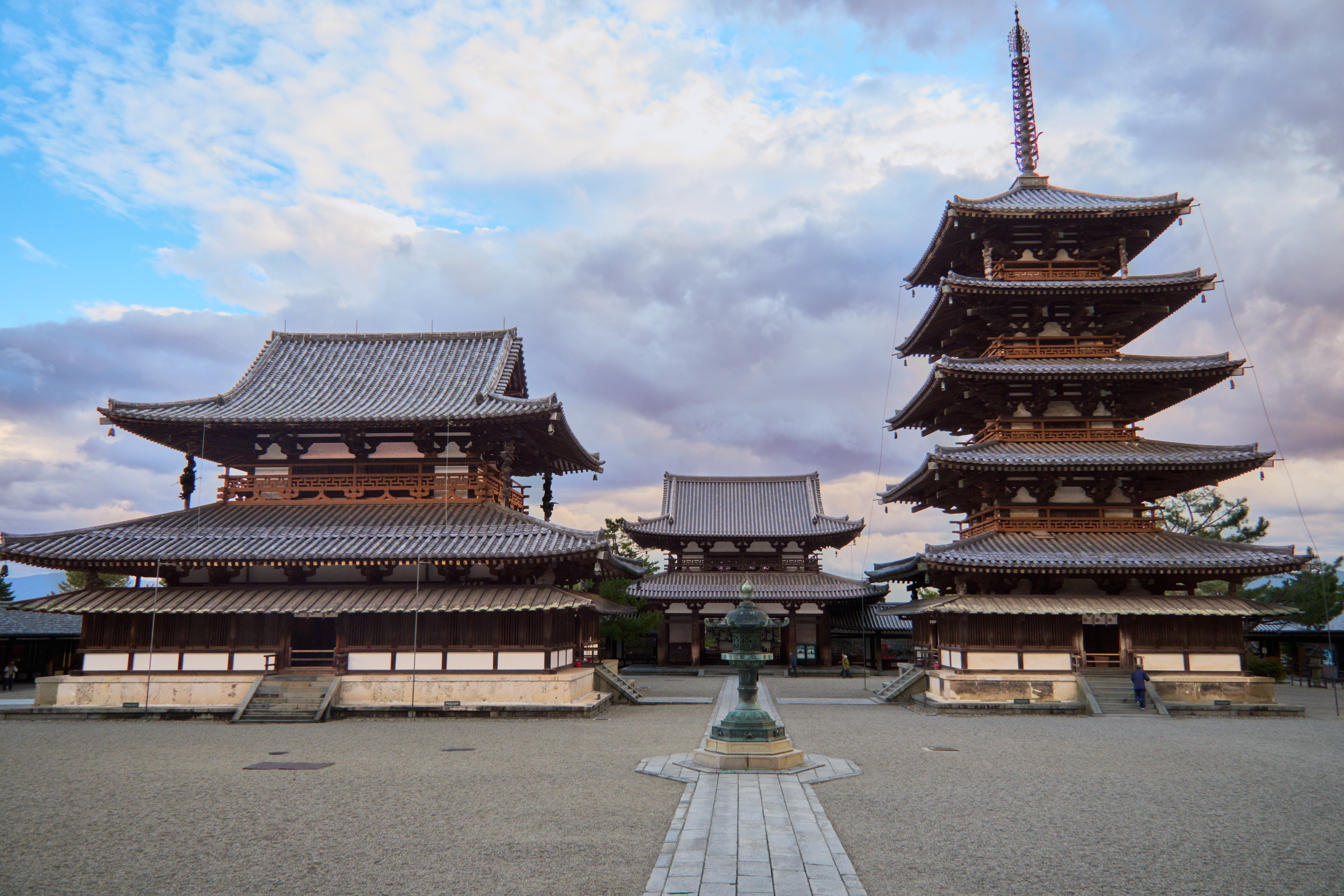
Frontal view, showing the Kondō (Golden Hall), Five-Storied Pagoda, and Chūmon (Middle Gate)

== See also ==
- Buddhist Monuments in the Hōryū-ji Area
- Buddhist temples in Japan
- Hokki-ji
- Japanese architecture
- List of National Treasures of Japan (crafts-others)
- List of National Treasures of Japan (sculptures)
- List of National Treasures of Japan (temples)
- List of tallest structures built before the 20th century
- Masaoka Shiki
- Nanto Shichi Daiji, Seven Great Temples of Nanto.
- Tourism in Japan
