= List of national treasures of Japan (temples) =

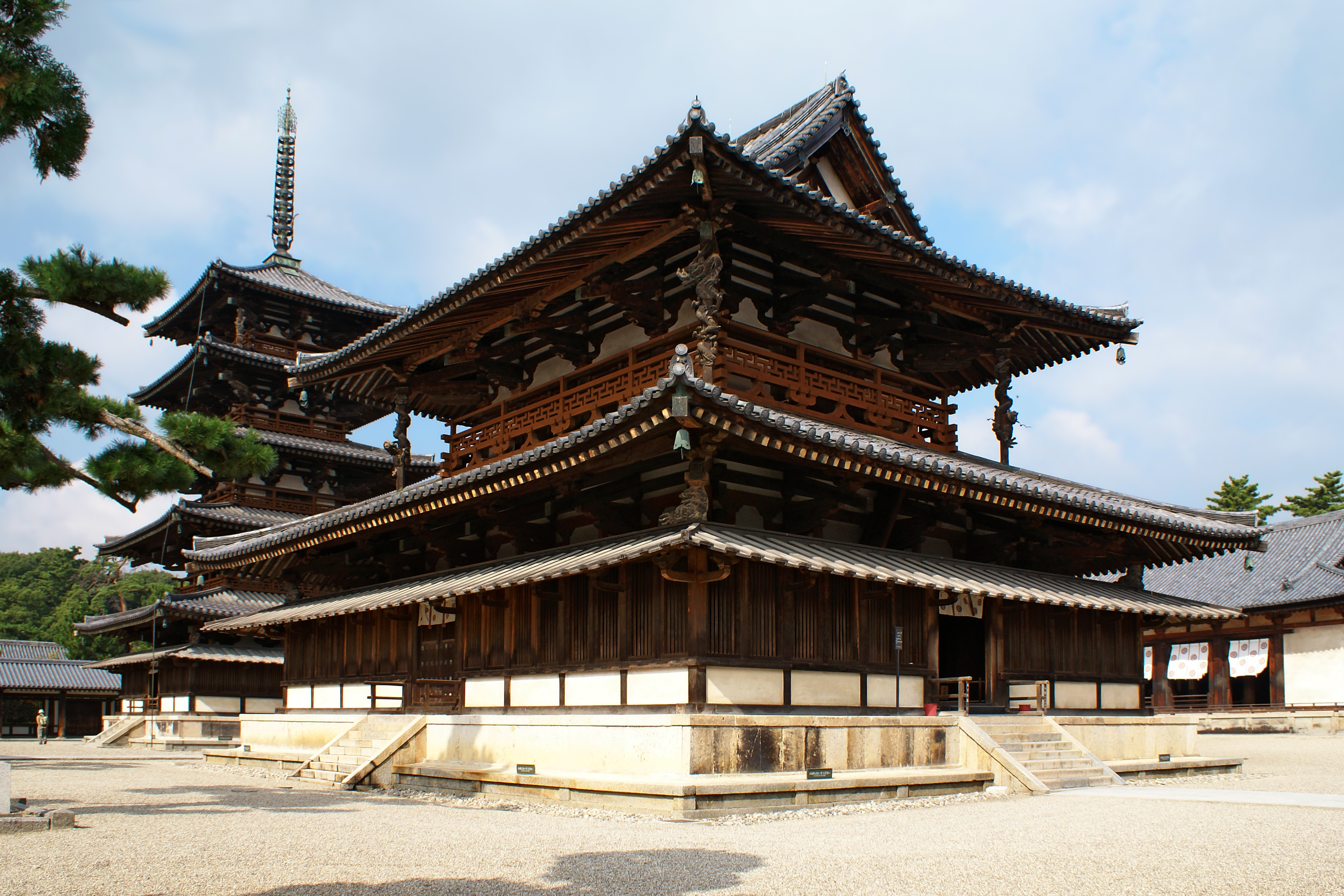
Kon-dō and five-storied pagoda at Hōryū-ji, two of the world's oldest wooden structures dating to around 700

The term "national treasure" has been used in Japan to denote cultural properties since 1897. The definition and the criteria have changed since the inception of the term. The temple structures in this list were designated national treasures when the Law for the Protection of Cultural Properties was implemented on June 9, 1951. The items are selected by the Ministry of Education, Culture, Sports, Science and Technology based on their "especially high historical or artistic value". This list presents 158 (Note: The national treasure structures of Zuiryū-ji are registered as a single national treasure under one registration number. Only in the main treasure table of this article, the single entry is split in three parts for readability.) entries of national treasure temple structures from the late 7th-century Classical Asuka period to the early modern 19th-century Edo period. The number of structures listed is more than 158, because in some cases groups of related structures are combined to form a single entry. The structures include main halls such as kon-dō, hon-dō, Butsuden; pagodas, gates, belfries (鐘楼,, shōrō), corridors, other halls and structures that are part of a Buddhist temple.

== History of Buddhist temples in Japan ==
Buddhism arrived in Japan in the mid–6th century, and was officially adopted in the wake of the Battle of Shigisan in 587, after which Buddhist temples began to be constructed. Soga no Umako built Hōkō-ji, the first temple in Japan, between 588 and 596. It was later renamed as Asuka-dera for Asuka, the name of the capital where it was located. Prince Shotoku actively promoted Buddhism and ordered the construction of Shitennō-ji in Osaka (593) and Hōryū-ji near his palace in Ikaruga (completed in 603). During the ancient period, the temple layout was strictly prescribed and followed mainland styles, with a main gate facing south, and the most sacred area surrounded by a semi-enclosed roofed corridor (kairō) accessible through a middle gate (chūmon). The sacred precinct contained a pagoda, which acted as a reliquary for sacred objects, and an image hall (kon-dō). The complex might have other structures such as a lecture hall (kōdō), a belfry (shōrō), a sutra repository (kyōzō), priests' and monks' quarters and bathhouses. The ideal temple had a heart formed by seven structures—called Shichidō garan. Buddhism, and the construction of temples, spread from the capital to outlying areas in the Hakuhō period from 645 to 710. Because of fire, earthquakes, typhoons and wars, few of the ancient temples remain. Hōryū-ji, rebuilt after a fire in 670, is the only temple with 7th-century structures which are the oldest extant wooden buildings in the world.

Unlike early Shinto shrines, early Buddhist temples were highly ornamental and strictly symmetrical. Starting with the late 7th century Hōryū-ji, temples began to move towards indigenous methods expressed by irregular ground plans that resulted in an asymmetric arrangement of buildings, greater use of natural materials such as cypress bark instead of roof tiling, and an increased awareness of natural environment with the placement of buildings among trees. This adaption was assisted by the syncretism of Shinto and Buddhism. During the first half of the 8th century, Emperor Shōmu decreed temples and nunneries be erected in each province and that Tōdai-ji be built as a headquarters for the network of temples. The head temple was inaugurated in 752 and was of monumental dimensions with two seven-storied pagodas, each ca. 100 m (330 ft) tall and a Great Buddha Hall (daibutsuden) about 80 m × 70 m (260 ft × 230 ft). Nara period Buddhism was characterised by seven influential state supported temples, the so-called Nanto Shichi Daiji. Octagonal structures such as the Hall of Dreams at Hōryū-ji built as memorial halls and storehouses exemplified by the Shōsōin first appeared during the Nara period. Temple structures, such as pagodas and main halls, had increased significantly in size since the late 6th century. The placement of the pagoda moved to a more peripheral location and the roof bracketing system increased in complexity as roofs grew larger and heavier.

The early Heian period (9th–10th century) saw an evolution of style based on the esoteric sects Tendai and Shingon, which were situated in mountainous areas. A new style termed wayō (和様, Japanese style) emerged with the following characteristics: a main hall divided in two parts; an outer area for novices and an inner area for initiates; a hip-and-gable roof that covered both areas; a raised wooden floor instead of the tile or stone floors of earlier temples; extended eaves to cover the front steps; shingles or bark rather than tile roofing; and an adaption to the natural environment in contrast to symmetrical layouts. The tahōtō, a two-storied tower with a resemblance to Indian stupas was also introduced by these sects during the Heian period. According to an ancient Buddhist prophecy, the world would enter a dark period in 1051. During this period the Tendai sect believed enlightenment was possible only by the veneration of Amida Buddha. Consequently, Paradise or Amida Halls—such as the Phoenix Hall at Byōdō-in (1053), the main hall of Jōruri-ji (1157) or the Golden Hall at Chūson-ji (1124)—were built by the imperial family or members of the aristocracy to recreate the western paradise of Amida on earth. Halls that enshrined the nine statues of Amida (Note: The statues represented the nine stages of nirvana.) were popular during the 12th century in the late Heian period. The main hall of Jōruri-ji is the only extant example of these halls.

The Daibutsu style and the Zen style emerged in the late 12th or early 13th century. The Daibutsu or Great Buddha style, introduced by the priest Chogen, was based on Song dynasty architecture and represented the antithesis of the wayō style. The Nandaimon at Tōdai-ji and the Amida Hall at Jōdo-ji are the only extant examples of this style. Characteristics of the Zen style are earthen floors, subtly curved pent roofs (mokoshi) and pronouncedly curved main roofs, cusped windows and panelled doors. Examples of this style include Butsuden at Kōzan-ji in Shimonoseki, Shakadō at Zenpuku-in and Octagonal Three-storied Pagoda at Anraku-ji. The three Japanese styles, wayō, Daibutsu and Zen were combined in the Muromachi period giving rise to a conglomerate eclectic style represented by the main hall at Kakurin-ji. By the end of the Muromachi period (late 16th century), Japanese Buddhist architecture had reached its apogee. Construction methods had been perfected and building types conventionalized. Early pre-modern temples were saved from monotony by elaborate structural details, the use of undulating karahafu gables and monumental size of the buildings. Representative examples for Momoyama (1568–1603) and Edo period (1603–1868) temple architecture are the Karamon at Hōgon-ji and the main hall of Kiyomizu-dera respectively.

== Statistics ==
Period	National treasures
Asuka period	5
Nara period	20
Heian period	20
Kamakura period	54
Muromachi period	29
Momoyama period	11
Edo period	19

Prefecture	City	National treasures
Aichi	Kira	1
Ehime	Matsuyama	3
Fukui	Obama	2
Fukushima	Iwaki	1
Gifu	Tajimi	2
Gifu	Takayama	1
Hiroshima	Fukuyama	2
Hiroshima	Hiroshima	1
Hiroshima	Onomichi	3
Hyōgo	Kakogawa	2
Hyōgo	Kasai	1
Hyōgo	Katō	1
Hyōgo	Kobe	1
Hyōgo	Ono	1
Iwate	Hiraizumi	1
Kagawa	Mitoyo	1
Kanagawa	Kamakura	1
Kōchi	Ōtoyo	1
Kyoto	Ayabe	1
Kyoto	Kizugawa	3
Kyoto	Kyoto	26
Kyoto	Uji	2
Mie	Tsu	2
Miyagi	Matsushima	2
Nagano	Aoki	1
Nagano	Nagano	1
Nagano	Ueda	1
Nagasaki	Nagasaki	2
Nara	Gojō	1
Nara	Ikaruga	19
Nara	Ikoma	1
Nara	Katsuragi	3
Nara	Nara	29
Nara	Sakurai	1
Nara	Uda	3
Nara	Yoshino	2
Ōita	Bungotakada	1
Osaka	Izumisano	1
Osaka	Kaizuka	1
Osaka	Kawachinagano	1
Shiga	Aishō	1
Shiga	Konan	4
Shiga	Kōra	2
Shiga	Nagahama	1
Shiga	Ōtsu	4
Tochigi	Ashikaga	1
Tokyo	Higashimurayama	1
Toyama	Takaoka	2
Wakayama	Iwade	1
Wakayama	Kainan	4
Wakayama	Kōya	2
Yamagata	Tsuruoka	1
Yamaguchi	Shimonoseki	1
Yamaguchi	Yamaguchi	1
Yamanashi	Kōshū	1
Yamanashi	Yamanashi	1

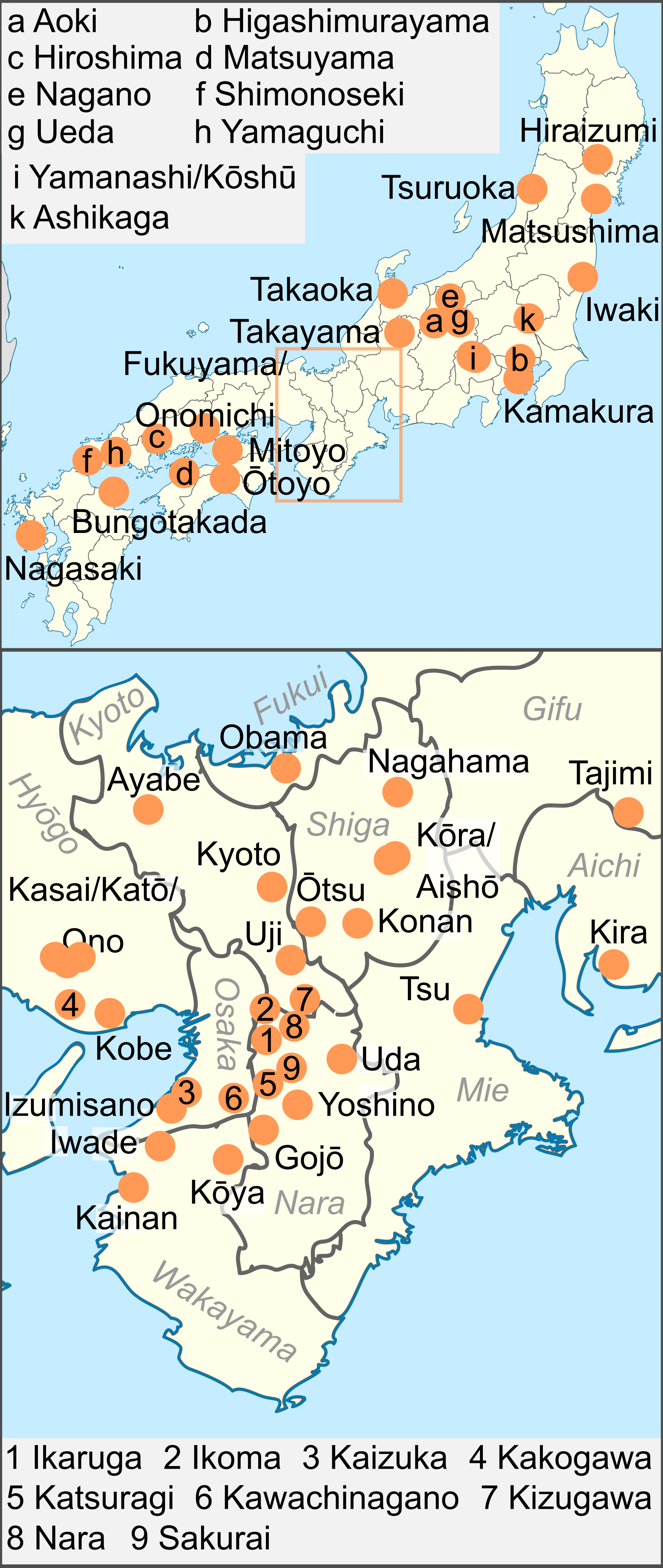
Cities with national treasures in the temple category

== Usage ==
The table's columns (except for Remarks and Image) are sortable pressing the arrows symbols. The following gives an overview of what is included in the table and how the sorting works.

- Name: name of the structure as registered in the Database of National Cultural Properties
- Temple: name of the temple in which the structure is located
- Remarks: architecture and general remarks including

- size measured in ken or distance between pillars; "m×n" denotes the length (m) and width (n) of the structure, each measured in ken
- architectural style (zukuri) and type of roofing

- Date: period and year; the column entries sort by year. If only a period is known, they sort by the start year of that period.
- Location: "town-name prefecture-name, geocoordinates of the structure"; the column entries sort as "prefecture-name town-name".
- Images: picture of the structure

== Treasures ==
Name	Temple	Remarks	Date	Location	Image
Golden Hall (金色堂, konjikidō) (Note: The following items are attached to the nomination: four munafuda (棟札) ridge tags with information on the building's construction, one votive tablet (納札, nōsatsu), six parts of a former handrail, six pieces of ancient timber, two pieces of former ornamental metal fittings)	Chūson-ji	3×3, 18 m (59 ft) square, single-storied, hōgyō style (Note: (hōgyō-zukuri, 宝形造): a pyramid shaped roof over a square building) roof with wooden shingles of the hongawara type (Note: (hongawarabuki, 本瓦葺): a tile roof composed of flat broad concave tiles and semi-cylindrical convex tiles covering the seams of the former)	late Heian period, 1124	Hiraizumi, Iwate; 39°0′4.9″N 141°5′59.6″E	
Priest's Quarters (庫裏, kuri) and Corridors (廊下, rōka) (Note: The nomination includes the entrance hall and a room in the northern aisle.)	Zuigan-ji	Kuri: 23.6 m × 13.8 m (77 ft × 45 ft), single-storied, kirizuma style, (Note: (kirizuma-zukuri, 切妻造): a gabled roof with equal lengths from the ridge to the eaves) entrance in the gable ends, hongawarabuki roof Corridors: between kuri and main hall (hondō), lengths: 2 ken (entrance hall), 6 ken (east corridor), 11 ken (middle corridor), 2 ken (west corridor); each is 1 ken wide, single-storied, irimoya style (Note: (irimoya-zukuri, 入母屋造): a hip-and-gable roof combining a ridge and two gable pediments on the upper part with a hipped roof on all sides in the lower part of the roof)	Momoyama period, 1609	Matsushima, Miyagi; 38°22′20″N 141°3′36.8″E	A wooden building with white walls and large gabled roof.
Main Hall (本堂, hon-dō) (Note: Two munafuda (棟札) ridge tags with information on the building's construction are attached to the nomination.)	Zuigan-ji	13×8, 39.0 m × 25.2 m (128.0 ft × 82.7 ft), single-storied, irimoya style with hongawarabuki roof and attached entrance hall	Momoyama period, 1609	Matsushima, Miyagi; 38°22′19.7″N 141°3′34.4″E	A wooden building with slightly raised floor and wooden sliding doors.
Five-storied Pagoda (五重塔, gojūnotō)	Three Mountains of Dewa	3×3, height: 29.0 m (95.1 ft), five-storied pagoda covered with hinoki cypress shingles	early Muromachi period, 1372	Tsuruoka, Yamagata; 38°42′17.01″N 139°58′3.08″E	A five-storied wooden pagoda in a forest.
Shiramizu Amidadō (白水阿弥陀堂)	Ganjō-ji	3×3, single-storied, hōgyō style, tochibuki board roofing, (Note: (tochibuki, 栩葺): type of board roofing whereby circa 1–3 cm (0.39–1.18 in) thick and 60 cm (24 in) long boards are split and laid down with considerable overlap) temple hall containing an enshrined image of Amitabha	late Heian period, 1160	Iwaki, Fukushima; 37°2′11.42″N 140°50′14.79″E	A wooden building with pyramid shaped roof. Colorful flags are hanging around the outer walls.
Main Hall (本堂, hondō)	Banna-ji	5×5, single-storied, irimoya style, front step canopy is 3 ken, nokikarahafu gable, (Note: (nokikarahafu, 軒唐破風): an undulating Karahafu gable at eave ends) back canopy 1 ken, hongawarabuki roof	Kamakura period, 1299	Ashikaga, Tochigi; 36°20′15.1″N 139°27′8.1″E	A wooden building with a large irregularly shaped roof.
Jizō Hall (地蔵堂, jizōdō) (Note: One munafuda (棟札) ridge tag with information on the building's construction is attached to the nomination.)	Shōfuku-ji	3×3, single-storied, irimoya style, covered with hinoki cypress shingles, with a pent roof enclosure (Note: (mokoshi, 裳階): a pent roof enclosure, generally one ken deep) of copper-tile roofing, oldest intact building in Tokyo	middle Muromachi period, 1407	Higashimurayama, Tokyo; 35°45′50.81″N 139°27′33.02″E	Tall wooden building with a hip-and-gable roof and a pent roof on all sides in the lower part.
Shariden (舎利殿)	Engaku-ji	3×3 reliquary hall, single-storied, irimoya style, with a pent roof enclosure, covered with hinoki cypress bark shingles	middle Muromachi period	Kamakura, Kanagawa; 35°20′21.52″N 139°32′56.24″E	A wooden building behind a roofed wall with a small Chinese style gate.
Buddha Hall (仏殿, butsuden) (Note: Three inscription boards (銘札) and five munafuda (棟札) ridge tags with information on the building's construction are attached to the nomination)	Zuiryū-ji	3×3 reliquary hall, single-storied, irimoya style, with a pent roof enclosure, lead plate roofing	early Edo period, 1659	Takaoka, Toyama; 36°44′8.12″N 137°0′37.8″E	Wooden building with a metal plate covered roof and an enclosing pent roof giving it the appearance of a two-storied structure.
Lecture Hall (法堂, hōdō, hattō)	Zuiryū-ji	11×9 main hall of worship, irimoya style, with a 2×1 step canopy and a karahafu gable, (Note: (karahafu, 唐破風): an undulating bargeboard flowing downwards from the top center with convex curves on each side that change to concave curves which either level off or turn upward at the ends) single-storied, copper plate roofing	early Edo period, 1655	Takaoka, Toyama; 36°44′8.48″N 137°0′36.07″E	Wooden building with a hip-and-gable roof and attached canopy with Chinese style gable. On either side, the building is connected to a wooden corridor.
Sanmon (山門) (Note: Two ancient drawings and two munafuda (棟札) ridge tags with information on the building's construction are attached to the nomination)	Zuiryū-ji	two-storied sangen-ikko (三間一戸) gate, irimoya style, covered with hinoki cypress shingles includes two 3×1 stairway buildings (山廊, sanrō) to either side of the gate: single-storied, kirizuma style with hinoki cypress shingles	late Edo period, 1818	Takaoka, Toyama; 36°44′8″N 137°0′40.11″E	Two-storied wooden gate with a hip-and-gable roof and a passage in the central bay.
Main Hall and Large Hall with timber platform (本堂、大広間及式台, hondō ōhiroma oyobi shikidai)	Shōkō-ji	Main Hall: 39.4 m × 37.5 m (129 ft × 123 ft), single-storied, irimoya style with a 3 ken step canopy and metal plate roofing Large Hall: 18.5 m × 19.7 m (61 ft × 65 ft), single-storied, front irimoya style, back kirizuma style Timber Platform: 16.1 m × 13.9 m (53 ft × 46 ft), single-storied, front irimoya style, back kirizuma style	Edo period, middle 17th century (Large Hall (大広間, ōhiroma)) and 1795 (main hall (本堂, hondō))	Takaoka, Toyama	Japanese style wooden building with external covered corridor and white walls.
Three-storied Pagoda (三重塔, sanjūnotō)	Myōtsū-ji	3×3, three-storied pagoda, hinoki cypress bark shingles	early Kamakura period, 1270	Obama, Fukui; 35°27′12.43″N 135°48′15.5″E	A three-storied wooden pagoda in a forest.
Main Hall (本堂, hondō)	Myōtsū-ji	5×6, single-storied, irimoya style with a 1 ken step canopy, hinoki cypress bark shingles	early Kamakura period, 1258	Obama, Fukui; 35°27′12.8″N 135°48′16″E	A wooden building with slightly raised floor, a hip-and-gable roof and a canopy over the steps.
Buddha Hall (仏殿, butsuden)	Seihaku-ji	3×3, single-storied, irimoya style, with a pent roof enclosure, covered with hinoki cypress bark shingles	middle Muromachi period, 1415	Yamanashi, Yamanashi; 35°41′37.5″N 138°42′28.94″E	Front view of a wooden building with hip-and-gable roof and an enclosing pent roof.
Yakushi Hall (薬師堂, yakushidō) or Main Hall (本堂, hondō) (Note: One miniature shrine is attached to the nomination.)	Daizen-ji	5×5, single-storied, yosemune style, (Note: (yosemune-zukuri, 寄棟造): a hipped roof where the front and back are trapezoidal and the sides triangular in shape; in Japan generally used for buildings of less importance) covered with hinoki cypress bark shingles, characteristic for the eastern Japanese style	late Kamakura period, 1286	Kōshū, Yamanashi; 35°39′25.84″N 138°44′34.86″E	Wooden building with a hipped roof and an enclosing veranda without handrails.
Octagonal Three-storied Pagoda (八角三重塔, hakkaku sanjūnotō) (Note: The nomination includes one butsudan Buddhist altar and one munafuda (棟札) ridge tag with information on the building's construction.)	Anraku-ji	three-storied octagonal pagoda, first roof is a pent roof enclosure, covered with hinoki cypress shingles, only extant octagonal pagoda in Japan	late Kamakura period	Ueda, Nagano; 36°21′8.62″N 138°9′8.2″E	Wooden three-storied pagoda with octagonal floor plan and an additional enclosing pent roof.
Main Hall (本堂, hondō) (Note: One miniature shrine is attached to the nomination.)	Zenkō-ji	14×5, single-storied with a pent roof enclosure, shumoku-zukuri (撞木造), entrance in the gable ends, front step canopy is 3 ken, nokikarahafu gable; step canopies on either side are 1 ken, everything is covered with hinoki cypress bark shingles	middle Edo period, 1707	Nagano, Nagano; 36°39′41.76″N 138°11′15.68″E	A large wooden building with an added pent roof enclosure and a Chinese style gable.
Three-storied Pagoda (三重塔, sanjūnotō)	Daihō-ji (大法寺)	3×3, three-storied pagoda, covered with hinoki cypress bark shingles	early Muromachi period, 1333	Aoki, Nagano; 36°22′56.54″N 138°8′54.55″E	
Scripture House (経蔵, kyōzō)	Ankoku-ji (安国寺)	Buddhist sutra storehouse, 1×1, single-storied, irimoya style, with a pent roof enclosure, covered with hinoki cypress shingles, includes an octagonal rotating sutra shelf (輪蔵, rinzō)	middle Muromachi period, 1408	Takayama, Gifu; 36°13′28.6″N 137°14′42.2″E	
Kannon Hall (観音堂, kannondō)	Eihō-ji	3×3, single-storied, irimoya style, with a pent roof enclosure, covered with hinoki cypress bark shingles	late Kamakura period, 1314	Tajimi, Gifu; 35°20′47.08″N 137°7′48.57″E	Wooden building with a hip-and-gable roof and a pent roof enclosure.
Founder's Hall (開山堂, kaisandō) (Note: One hōkyōintō is attached to the nomination.)	Eihō-ji	worship hall (外陣, gejin) 3×3 and inner sanctum (内陣, naijin) 1×1 connected via an intermediate passage (相の間, ai no ma); All structures are single-storied, irimoya style and have hinoki cypress bark roofing. The naijin has a pent roof enclosure.	early Muromachi period	Tajimi, Gifu; 35°20′46.12″N 137°7′45.08″E	Small wooden building with white walls and hip-and-gable roof connected to another wooden structure in the back.
Amida Hall (弥陀堂, amidadō)	Konren-ji (金蓮寺)	3×3, single-storied, yosemune style, hinoki cypress bark roofing	late Kamakura period	Kira, Aichi; 34°48′33.69″N 137°4′21.05″E	A wooden building with a wide front veranda.
Miei Hall (御影堂, mieidō)	Senju-ji	9×9, single-storied, irimoya style with a 3 ken step canopy hongawarabuki roof	middle Edo period, 1666	Tsu, Mie; 34°45′43.65″N 136°30′12.38″E	Large wooden building with tile roof.
Nyorai Hall (如来堂, nyoraidō)	Senju-ji	5×4, single-storied, irimoya style with a pent roof enclosure, a 3 ken step canopy and a karahafu gable, hongawarabuki roof	middle Edo period, 1748	Tsu, Mie; 34°45′44.75″N 136°30′10.13″E	A large wooden building with an added pent roof enclosure and a Chinese style gable.
Golden Hall (金堂, kon-dō) (Note: One miniature shrine is attached to the nomination.)	Mii-dera	7×7, single-storied, irimoya style with a 3 ken step canopy, hinoki cypress bark roofing	Momoyama period, 1599	Ōtsu, Shiga; 35°0′48.25″N 135°51′10.3″E	Wooden building with raised floor, a railed veranda and roofed stairs leading to the central entrance.
Konpon-chūdō (根本中堂) (Note: Three dais and shrines are attached to the nomination.)	Enryaku-ji	11×6, 37.6 m × 23.9 m (123 ft × 78 ft), single-storied, irimoya style, copper sheeting over wooden plannks with semi-circular battens covering the seams; main hall founded in 788 by Dengyō Daishi with an "Inextinguishable Dharma Light" burning inside, in front of the Yakushi Nyorai (Medicine Buddha). part of the World Heritage Site Historic Monuments of Ancient Kyoto (Kyoto, Uji and Otsu Cities)	early Edo period, 1640	Ōtsu, Shiga; 35°4′13.64″N 135°50′27.39″E	A building with large hip-and-gable roof beyond a roofed enclosure.
Main Hall (本堂, hondō) (Note: One miniature shrine is attached to the nomination.)	Kongōrin-ji	7×7, single-storied, irimoya style, covered with hinoki cypress bark shingles	early Muromachi period	Aishō, Shiga; 35°9′40.57″N 136°16′58.95″E	Wooden building with hip-and-gable roof, white walls and light colored wooden beams.
Three-storied Pagoda (三重塔, sanjūnotō) (Note: One concave and one convex roof tile are attached to the nomination)	Jōraku-ji	3×3, three-storied pagoda, hongawarabuki roof	middle Muromachi period, 1400	Konan, Shiga; 34°59′25.09″N 136°2′57.22″E	Wooden three-storied pagoda at the top of a long flight of stairs.
Main Hall (本堂, hondō) (Note: One miniature shrine is attached to the nomination)	Jōraku-ji	7×6, single-storied, irimoya style with a 3 ken step canopy and hinoki cypress bark roofing	early Muromachi period, 1360	Konan, Shiga; 34°59′24.48″N 136°2′54.7″E	Wooden building with slightly raised floor, a step canopy and a railed veranda.
Three-storied Pagoda (三重塔, sanjūnotō)	Saimyō-ji	3×3, three-storied pagoda, hinoki cypress bark shingles	late Kamakura period	Kōra, Shiga; 35°10′58.83″N 136°17′6.82″E	
Main Hall (本堂, hondō)	Saimyō-ji	7×7, single-storied, irimoya style with a 3 ken step canopy, hinoki cypress bark shingles	early Kamakura period	Kōra, Shiga; 35°10′59.63″N 136°17′7.63″E	
Tahōtō (多宝塔) (Note: One munafuda (棟札) ridge tag with information on the building's construction is attached to the nomination.)	Ishiyama-dera	3×3, two-storied Buddhist tower with a pent roof, square base and round top, hinoki cypress bark shingles	early Kamakura period, 1194	Ōtsu, Shiga; 34°57′39.48″N 135°54′21.43″E	A wooden two-storied pagoda with a square base, round top and a pyramid shaped roof.
Main Hall (本堂, hon-dō)	Ishiyama-dera	Hon-dō: 7×4, Ai-no-ma: 1×7, Worship hall (礼堂, rai-dō): 9×4, overhang style (懸造, kake-zukuri), rai-dō and hon-dō are in yosemune style and connected via the roof of the ai-no-ma, each of the three structures is covered with hinoki cypress bark shingles	late Heian period, 1096	Ōtsu, Shiga; 34°57′37.66″N 135°54′20.26″E	A wooden building with enclosing veranda built on tall wooden pillars.
Main Hall (本堂, hondō)	Zensui-ji	7×5, single-storied, irimoya style, hinoki cypress bark shingles	early Muromachi period, 1366	Konan, Shiga; 35°0′23.2″N 136°6′45.2″E	Wooden building with a hip-and-gable roof and an enclosing veranda.
Main Hall (本堂, hondō)	Chōju-ji (長寿寺)	5×5, single-storied, yosemune style with a 3 ken step canopy, hinoki cypress bark shingles	early Kamakura period	Konan, Shiga; 34°59′7.17″N 136°3′35.62″E	Wooden building with a hipped roof, slightly raised floor, an enclosing veranda and a wide central staircase on the front.
Karamon (唐門)	Hōgon-ji	four-legged gate (Note: (shikyakumon, 四脚門): a single-storied gate with two main pillars in line with the ridge of the roof and a pair of supporting square posts ("legs") on either side. generally with a gabled roof) with karahafu gables over the front and back entrance, 3.3 m × 6.1 m (11 ft × 20 ft), hinoki cypress bark shingles; entrance to the Kannon hall	Momoyama period, 1603	Nagahama, Shiga; 35°25′14.04″N 136°8′37.63″E	A gate with a large undulating Chinese style gable over the entrance.
Five-storied Pagoda (五重塔, gojūnotō)	Kaijūsen-ji	3×3, five-storied pagoda, hongawarabuki roof, first roof is a pent roof enclosure of copper-tile roofing	early Kamakura period, 1214	Kizugawa, Kyoto; 34°46′36.33″N 135°51′43.33″E	A five-storied pagoda with vermillion red beams and greenish roof. Just below the first-story roof there is an additional pent roof.
Golden Hall (金堂, kon-dō)	Tō-ji	5×3, single-storied, irimoya style with pent roof enclosure, hongawarabuki roof, part of the World Heritage Site Historic Monuments of Ancient Kyoto (Kyoto, Uji and Otsu Cities)	Momoyama period, 1603	Kyoto; 34°58′49.32″N 135°44′51.67″E	Large wooden building with a hip-and-gable roof and enclosing pent roof.
Five-storied Pagoda (五重塔, gojūnotō)	Tō-ji	3×3, five-storied pagoda, hongawarabuki roof, at 54.8 m (180 ft) highest wooden pagoda in Japan, part of the World Heritage Site Historic Monuments of Ancient Kyoto (Kyoto, Uji and Otsu Cities)	early Edo period, 1643	Kyoto; 34°58′47.59″N 135°44′55.34″E	
Daishi Hall (大師堂, daishidō) or Miei Hall (御影堂, mieidō) (west section): ushiro-dō (後堂), mae-dō (前堂) and chūmon (中門) (Note: One miniature shrine and five munafuda (棟札) ridge tags with information on the building's construction are attached to the nomination.)	Tō-ji	ushiro-dō: 7×4, irimoya style, 2 ken hisashi on the north-western end, 1 ken step canopy on the east side mae-dō: 4×5, north side irimoya style, connected to the ushiro-dō in the south chūmon: 2×1, west side kirizuma style, connected to the mae-dō in the east All three structures are single-storied. part of the World Heritage Site Historic Monuments of Ancient Kyoto (Kyoto, Uji and Otsu Cities)	early Muromachi period, 1380	Kyoto; 34°58′53.91″N 135°44′48.45″E	Wooden building with railed veranda, white walls and a hip-and-gable roof.
Lotus Flower Gate (蓮花門, rengemon)	Tō-ji	eight-legged gate, (Note: (hakkyakumon, 八脚門): a single-storied gate with four main pillars in line with the ridge of the roof and four supporting square posts ("legs") on either side. generally with a gabled roof) kirizuma style, hongawarabuki roof, part of the World Heritage Site Historic Monuments of Ancient Kyoto (Kyoto, Uji and Otsu Cities)	early Kamakura period	Kyoto; 34°58′50.44″N 135°44′46.73″E	Wooden gate with gabled roof and white walls beyond a pond.
Niōmon (二王門, niōmon)	Kōmyō-ji (光明寺)	two-storied sangen-ikko (三間一戸) gate, irimoya style, tochibuki board roofing	early Kamakura period, 1248	Ayabe, Kyoto; 35°23′14.63″N 135°26′31.41″E	A two-storied gate with vermillion red beams.
Keigū-in Main Hall (桂宮院本堂, keigu-in hondō)	Kōryū-ji	octagonal hall, single-storied, hinoki cypress bark shingles	early Kamakura period, before 1251	Kyoto, Kyoto; 35°0′54.1″N 135°42′19.53″E	—
Sekisui-in (石水院)	Kōzan-ji	(3 (front) or 4 (back))x3, with a 1 ken hisashi on the front side, single-storied, irimoya style, entrance on gable ends, hinoki cypress shingles	early Kamakura period	Kyoto, Kyoto; 35°3′36.48″N 135°40′42.72″E	Room with wooden floor open on two sides. There is a small statue placed in the center of the room.
Three-storied Pagoda (三重塔, sanjūnotō)	Jōruri-ji	3×3, three-storied pagoda, hinoki cypress bark shingles	late Heian period, before 1178	Kizugawa, Kyoto34°42′56.34″N 135°52′24.94″E	Wooden pagoda with white walls and vermillion red beams.
Main Hall (本堂, hondō)	Jōruri-ji	11×4, 33.8 m × 16.5 m (111 ft × 54 ft), yosemune style with a 1 ken step canopy, hongawarabuki roof	late Heian period, 1157	Kizugawa, Kyoto34°42′56.81″N 135°52′21.49″E	Low and wide building with hipped roof, white walls, beyond a lake.
Golden Hall (金堂, kon-dō)	Ninna-ji	7×5, single-storied, irimoya style with a 1 ken step canopy, hongawarabuki roof, part of the World Heritage Site Historic Monuments of Ancient Kyoto (Kyoto, Uji and Otsu Cities)	Momoyama period, 1613	Kyoto35°1′51.88″N 135°42′49.72″E	Wooden building with a hip-and-gable roof, an enclosing veranda and metal ornaments.
Main Hall (本堂, hon-dō) (Note: Three miniature shrines are attached to the nomination.)	Kiyomizu-dera	9×7, 33.5 m × 33.2 m (110 ft × 109 ft), single-storied, yosemune style, pent roof enclosure on east, north and west side, hinoki cypress bark shingles, includes a stage, temple is part of the World Heritage Site Historic Monuments of Ancient Kyoto (Kyoto, Uji and Otsu Cities)	early Edo period, 1633	Kyoto; 34°59′41.4″N 135°47′5.83″E	Wooden building with large hipped roof constructed on long poles.
Main Hall (本堂, hon-dō) (Note: The entrance hall and four munafuda (棟札) ridge tags with information on the building's construction are attached to the nomination.)	Daisen-in (Daitoku-ji)	14.8 m × 10.8 m (49 ft × 35 ft), single-storied, irimoya style, copper-tile roofing	late Muromachi period, 1513	Kyoto; 35°2′40.37″N 135°44′44.72″E	A wall with window and a raked stone garden.
Hōjō (方丈) with Entrance (玄関, genkan)	Daitoku-ji	Hōjō: 29.8 m × 17.0 m (97.8 ft × 55.8 ft), single-storied, irimoya style, sangawarabuki tile roof, (Note: (sangawarabuki, 桟瓦葺): a roof tile combining a broad concave tile with a semi-cylindrical convex tile into one tile. The tile is square undulating from concave to convex.) connected to the (雲門庵) at the back; Entrance: 6×1, single-storied, karahafu gable, sangawarabuki tile roof; residence of the head priest. Hōjō meditation hall was built in 1502.	early Edo period, 1635, (entrance from 1636)	Kyoto; 35°2′38.4″N 135°44′47.2″E	—
Karamon (唐門)	Daitoku-ji	four-legged gate, kirizuma style, nokikarahafu gable on front and back, hinoki cypress bark shingles	Momoyama period	Kyoto; 35°2′37.51″N 135°44′47.14″E	
Main Hall (本堂, hondō) or Senbon Shakadō (千本釈迦堂) (Note: One miniature shrine, three former ridge beams and three munafuda (棟札) ridge tags with information on the building's construction are attached to the nomination.)	Daihōon-ji	5×6, single-storied, irimoya style with a 1 ken step canopy, hinoki cypress bark shingles	early Kamakura period, 1227	Kyoto; 35°1′54.68″N 135°44′23.44″E	Wooden building with a step canopy.
Golden Hall (金堂, kondō)	Daigo-ji	7×5, single-storied, irimoya style, hongawarabuki roof, principal hall relocated from Yuasa, Wakayama which was completed in 1600. part of the World Heritage Site Historic Monuments of Ancient Kyoto (Kyoto, Uji and Otsu Cities)	late Heian period	Kyoto; 34°57′5.33″N 135°49′18.29″E	Wooden building with hip-and-gable roof, white walls, vermillionred beams and an open veranda.
Five-storied Pagoda (五重塔, gojūnotō)	Daigo-ji	3×3, five-storied pagoda, height: 38 m (125 ft) including the 13 m (43 ft) finial, hongawarabuki roof, part of the World Heritage Site Historic Monuments of Ancient Kyoto (Kyoto, Uji and Otsu Cities)	middle Heian period, 952	Kyoto; 34°57′2.1″N 135°49′19.67″E	Five-storied wooden pagoda with white walls and vermillion red beams.
Yakushi Hall (薬師堂, yakushidō)	Daigo-ji (Upper Daigo (上醍醐, kamidaigo))	5×4, single-storied, irimoya style, hinoki cypress bark shingles, part of the World Heritage Site Historic Monuments of Ancient Kyoto (Kyoto, Uji and Otsu Cities)	late Heian period, 1121	Kyoto; 34°56′44.25″N 135°50′19.46″E	Wooden building on a stone platform with white walls.
Sanmon (三門)	Chion-in	large 5 ken or 50 m (160 ft) wide, 24 m (79 ft) high two-storied gate with entrances in the three central bays, irimoya style, hongawarabuki roof includes two 3×2 stairway buildings (山廊, sanrō) to either side of the gate: single-storied, kirizuma style with hongawarabuki roof; largest extant two-storied, double-roofed gate	early Edo period, 1621	Kyoto; 35°0′17.28″N 135°46′54.5″E	A large two-storied wooden gate with a veranda on the upper story and a hip-and-gable style roof. A small wooden building with gabled roof is placed next to it.
Main Hall (本堂, hondō) or Miei Hall (御影堂, mieidō) (Note: A corridor is attached to the nomination.)	Chion-in	11×9, single-storied, irimoya style with a 5 ken step canopy at the front and a 3 ken step canopy at the back	early Edo period, 1639	Kyoto; 35°0′18.86″N 135°47′0.19″E	Large wooden building with raised floor, enclosing veranda, white walls and a hip-and-gable roof.
Sanmon (三門)	Tōfuku-ji	large 5 ken, 22 m (72 ft) high two-storied gate with entrances in the three central bays, irimoya style, hongawarabuki roof includes two stairway buildings (山廊, sanrō) to either side of the gate: single-storied, kirizuma style with hongawarabuki roof, oldest Zen main gate in Japan	middle Muromachi period, 1425	Kyoto; 34°58′32.53″N 135°46′25.47″E	A large two-storied wooden gate with white walls, a veranda on the upper story and a hip-and-gable style roof. Two small wooden open structures with gabled roofs are placed next to it on either side.
Hōjō (方丈)	Nanzen-ji	ōhōjō (大方丈): irimoya style ōhōjō (小方 丈): back side with a kirizuma style gable, front connected to the ōhōjō both structures are single-storied and covered with hinoki cypress shingles; residence of the head priest	middle Momoyama period, 1573–1591	Kyoto; 35°0′41.09″N 135°47′40.06″E	A wooden building with roofed veranda next to a raked gravel garden.
Phoenix Hall (鳳凰堂, hōōdō): central hall (中堂, chū-dō), wing corridors (両翼廊, ryōyokurō), (尾廊) (Note: Eight doors (板扉, itatobira) made of a single thick wooden plank and a pair of phoenix roof ornaments are attached to the nomination.)	Byōdō-in	central hall: 3×2, single-storied, irimoya style with a pent roof enclosure, hongawarabuki roof wing corridors: 8×1 (with bends), single storied with an upper floor, kirizuma style; corner towers are two-storied with three floors, hōgyō style, hongawarabuki roof 尾 廊: 7×1, single-storied, kirizuma style, hongawarabuki roof main temple building, depicted on the 10 yen coin, part of the World Heritage Site Historic Monuments of Ancient Kyoto (Kyoto, Uji and Otsu Cities)	middle Heian period, 1053	Uji, Kyoto; 34°53′21.49″N 135°48′27.6″E	Wide wooden building on an island consisting of a central structure connected on either side to open corridors with towers at the end.
Mahavira Hall (大雄宝殿, daiō hōden), Hattō (法堂) and tennōden (天王殿)	Manpuku-ji			Uji, Kyoto 34°54′49.93″N 135°48′27.31″E	
Amida Hall (阿弥陀堂, amidadō)	Hōkai-ji (法界寺)	5×5, single-storied, irimoya style with a pent roof enclosure, hōgyō style, hinoki cypress bark shingles	early Kamakura period	Kyoto; 34°56′2.91″N 135°48′53.61″E	Wooden building with slightly raised floor, an open veranda and a pyramid shaped roof.
Amida Hall (阿弥陀堂, amidadō)	Nishi Honganji	45.2 m × 42.1 m (148 ft × 138 ft), single-storied, irimoya style, 3 ken lean-to eaves (向拝, kohai),hongawarabuki roof, part of the World Heritage Site Historic Monuments of Ancient Kyoto (Kyoto, Uji and Otsu Cities)	late Edo period, 1760	Kyoto; 34°59′31.74″N 135°45′6.04″E	
Goeidō (御影堂)	Nishi Honganji	62.1 m × 53.8 m (204 ft × 177 ft), single-storied, irimoya style, 3 ken lean-to eaves (向拝, kohai),hongawarabuki roof, part of the World Heritage Site Historic Monuments of Ancient Kyoto (Kyoto, Uji and Otsu Cities)	Edo period, 1636	Kyoto; 34°59′29.02″N 135°45′6.08″E	
Karamon (唐門)	Nishi Honganji	four-legged gate with karahafu gables on the front and back, sides are irimoya style, hinoki cypress bark shingles, part of the World Heritage Site Historic Monuments of Ancient Kyoto (Kyoto, Uji and Otsu Cities)	Momoyama period, ca. 1598	Kyoto; 34°59′25.31″N 135°45′3.93″E	Black wooden gate with colorful ornamentation and a Chinese style gable on the front.
Priest's Quarters (庫裏, kuri)	Myōhō-in (妙法院)	21.8 m × 23.7 m (72 ft × 78 ft), single-storied, irimoya style, entrance in gable ends, 1 ken entrance hall with karahafu gable, hongawarabuki roof, hisashi in the north	Momoyama period, 1573–1614	Kyoto; 34°59′25.41″N 135°46′30.71″E	Wooden building with white walls and hip-and-gable style roof.
Hōjō (方丈) (Note: The entrance hall and three munafuda (棟札) ridge tags with information on the building's construction are attached to the nomination.)	Ryōginan (竜吟庵) (Tōfuku-ji)	16.5 m × 12.9 m (54 ft × 42 ft), single-storied, irimoya style, hinoki cypress shingles, residence of the head priest	early Muromachi period, 1387	Kyoto; 34°58′38.79″N 135°46′29.44″E	Wooden building with an open veranda next to a raked gravel garden.
Main Hall (本堂, hondō)	Sanjūsangen-dō	35×5, single-storied, kirizuma style with a 7 ken step canopy, hongawarabuki roof	Kamakura period, 1266	Kyoto; 34°59′16.12″N 135°46′18.15″E	A very long wooden building with open veranda and slightly raised roof.
Golden Hall (金堂, kondō)	Kanshin-ji	7×7, single-storied, irimoya style with a 3 ken step canopy, hongawarabuki roof; principal hall	early Muromachi period, Shōhei era	Kawachinagano, Osaka; 34°26′14.48″N 135°35′54.8″E	Wooden building with raised floor, white walls, vermillion red beams, an open veranda and a hip-and-gable roof.
Kannon Hall (観音堂, kannondō)	Kōon-ji (孝恩寺)	5×5, single-storied, yosemune style, hongawarabuki roof	late Kamakura period, 1300	Kaizuka, Osaka; 34°23′49.85″N 135°23′40.21″E	Wooden building with raised floor, white walls and a tile roof.
Tahōtō (多宝塔) (Note: One buddhist altar (仏壇, butsudan) is attached to the nomination.)	Jigen-in (慈眼院)	3×3, two-storied Buddhist tower (tahōtō), hinoki cypress bark shingles	early Kamakura period, 1271	Izumisano, Osaka; 34°22′27.3″N 135°20′36.0″E	Two-storied wooden pagoda with a square lower and a round upper floor.
Three-storied Pagoda (三重塔, sanjūnotō)	Ichijō-ji	3×3, three-storied pagoda, hongawarabuki roof	late Heian period, 1171	Kasai, Hyōgo; 34°51′32.28″N 134°49′8.46″E	Three-storied wooden pagoda on a hillside.
Jōdo Hall (浄土堂, jōdodō) or Amida Hall (阿弥陀堂, amidadō)	Jōdo-ji	3×3, 18 m (59 ft) squared, single-storied, hōgyō style, hongawarabuki roof	early Kamakura period, 1192	Ono, Hyōgo; 34°51′51.27″N 134°57′39.89″E	Wooden building with slightly raised floor, open veranda, red beams, white walls and a pyramid shaped roof.
Main Hall (本堂, hondō)	Taisan-ji	7×6, single-storied, irimoya style, gable roof covered with copper	late Kamakura period, 1285	Kobe, Hyōgo; 34°41′47.73″N 135°4′2.81″E	Wooden building with white walls, vermillion red beams, slightly raised floor and a hip-and-gable roof.
Main Hall (本堂, hondō) (Note: A miniature shrine with two wooden panels is attached to the nomination.)	Chōkō-ji	7×7, single-storied, yosemune style with a 3 ken step canopy, hongawarabuki roof	middle Muromachi period, 1413–1428	Katō, Hyōgo; 34°55′56.86″N 135°2′37.86″E	Wooden building with raised floor and a wide staircase.
Taishidō (太子堂)	Kakurin-ji	3×3, single-storied, hōgyō style, hinoki cypress bark shingles	late Heian period, 1112	Kakogawa, Hyōgo; 34°45′7.66″N 134°49′58.14″E	Wooden building with a pyramid shaped roof and an open veranda on the front. A stair leads at one end of the veranda to the building's level.
Main Hall (本堂, hondō)	Kakurin-ji	7×6, 17 m × 15.2 m (56 ft × 50 ft), single-storied, irimoya style, hongawarabuki roof	middle Muromachi period, 1397	Kakogawa, Hyōgo; 34°45′8.18″N 134°49′57.29″E	Wooden building with a hip-and-gable roof and a central staircase leading to the raised floor level.
Small Five-storied Pagoda (五重小塔, gojū-no-shōtō) (Note: A wooden box with two hand scrolls of the Lotus sutra and two rafter caps are attached to the nomination.)	Kairyūō-ji (海龍王寺)	3×3, 4.0 m (13.1 ft) high miniature pagoda, wooden hongawarabuki shaped roof	Nara period, Tenpyō era	Nara, Nara; 34°45′8.18″N 134°49′57.29″E	Wooden miniature pagoda with white walls and vermillion red beams.
Five-storied Pagoda (五重塔, gojūnotō)	Kōfuku-ji	3×3, five-storied pagoda, second highest pagoda in Japan at 50.1 m (164 ft), hongawarabuki roof; restoration from 1426 of an original pagoda from 730, part of the World Heritage Site Historic Monuments of Ancient Nara	middle Muromachi period, 1426	Nara, Nara; 34°40′56.92″N 135°49′56.03″E	Wooden five-storied pagoda with white walls.
Three-storied Pagoda (三重塔, sanjūnotō)	Kōfuku-ji	3×3, three-storied pagoda, hongawarabuki roof; reconstruction from the beginning of the Kamakura period of an original pagoda from 1143, part of the World Heritage Site Historic Monuments of Ancient Nara	early Kamakura period	Nara, Nara; 34°40′56.11″N 135°49′46.89″E	Three-storied wooden pagoda.
Eastern Golden Hall (東金堂, tōkondō)	Kōfuku-ji	7×4, single-storied, yosemune style, hongawarabuki roof, the remaining of the three golden halls, reconstruction from 1415 of an original structure from 726, part of the World Heritage Site Historic Monuments of Ancient Nara	middle Muromachi period, 1425	Nara, Nara; 34°40′58.42″N 135°49′56.01″E	Wooden building with white walls and a trapezoidal roof.
North Octagonal Hall (北円堂, hokuendō) (Note: Eight kokabe (小壁) walls of the former inner sanctuary and one munafuda (棟札) ridge tag with information on the building's construction are attached to the nomination.)	Kōfuku-ji	octagonal hall, single-storied, hongawarabuki roof; reconstruction from 1426 of an original hall built in 721 to honor the first anniversary of the death of Fujiwara no Fuhito, part of the World Heritage Site Historic Monuments of Ancient Nara	early Kamakura period, 1210	Nara, Nara; 34°41′0.42″N 135°49′47.76″E	Small octagonal wooden building with white walls and red beams.
Niō Gate (二王門, niōmon) (Note: One wind bell (風鐸, fūtaku) is attached to the nomination.)	Kinpusen-ji	two-storied sangen-ikko (三間一戸) gate, irimoya style, hongawarabuki roof	middle Muromachi period, 1456	Yoshino, Nara; 34°22′8.03″N 135°51′32.24″E	A two-storied wooden gate with white walls and faded red colored beams. There are two guardian statues in the side bays of the lower floor.
Main Hall (本堂, hondō) or Zaō Hall (蔵王堂, zaōdō)	Kinpusen-ji	5×6, single-storied, irimoya style with a pent roof enclosure, hinoki cypress bark shingles	Momoyama period, 1591	Yoshino, Nara; 34°22′6.09″N 135°51′32.17″E	Large wooden building with a hip-and-gable roof and an enclosing pent roof. There is a railed open veranda above the pent roof.
Small Five-storied Pagoda (五重小塔, gojū-no-shōtō)	Gangō-ji Gokurakubō (元興寺極楽坊)	3×3, 5.5 m (18 ft) tall miniature pagoda, wooden hongawarabuki shaped roof, part of the World Heritage Site Historic Monuments of Ancient Nara	Nara period, late 8th century	Nara, Nara; 34°40′39.07″N 135°49′52.84″E	Wooden miniature five-storied pagoda with white walls.
Zen Room (禅室, zenshitsu)	Gangō-ji Gokurakubō (元興寺極楽坊)	4×4, single-storied, kirizuma style, hongawarabuki roof with smooth, lipless, semi-cylindrical cover tiles (行基葺, gyōgibuki); part of the World Heritage Site Historic Monuments of Ancient Nara, contains lumber used in the construction of Asuka-dera, one of the first Buddhist temples in Japan	early Kamakura period	Nara, Nara; 34°40′40.65″N 135°49′51.59″E	Long wooden building with white walls.
Main Hall (本堂, hondō), (Note: The nomination includes, a miniature shrine, one butsudan Buddhist altar and one munafuda (棟札) ridge tag with information on the building's construction.) part of the World Heritage Site Historic Monuments of Ancient Nara	Gangō-ji Gokurakubō (元興寺極楽坊)	6×6, single-storied, yosemune style, entrance in gable ends, hongawarabuki roof with smooth, lipless, semi-cylindrical cover tiles (行基葺, gyōgibuki), 1 ken wide open veranda on the front side, contains an akadana (閼伽棚)	early Kamakura period, 1244	Nara, Nara; 34°40′40.57″N 135°49′52.7″E	Wooden building with pyramid shaped roof and white walls.
Golden Hall (金堂, kon-dō)	Murō-ji	5×5, single-storied, yosemune style, hinoki cypress shingles; principal hall	early Heian period	Uda, Nara; 34°32′16.4″N 136°02′26.2″E	Wooden building. In front of the entrance there is an open veranda consturcted on poles.
Five-storied Pagoda (五重塔, gojūnotō)	Murō-ji	3×3, five-storied pagoda, hinoki cypress bark shingles	early Heian period	Uda, Nara; 34°32′17.42″N 136°2′25.18″E	Wooden five-storied pagoda with white walls and red beams.
Main Hall (本堂, hondō) or Kanjō Hall (灌頂堂, kanjōdō) (Note: The nomination includes a miniature shrine and one butsudan Buddhist altar.)	Murō-ji	5×5, single-storied, irimoya style, hinoki cypress bark shingles	late Kamakura period, 1308	Uda, Nara; 34°32′16.44″N 136°2′26.09″E	Wooden building with open railed veranda and slightly raised floor.
Main Hall (本堂, hon-dō)	Akishinodera	5×4, single-storied, yosemune style, hongawarabuki roof	early Kamakura period	Nara, Nara; 34°42′13.57″N 135°46′34.28″E	Wooden building on a stone platform with white walls.
Main Hall (本堂, hon-dō)	Jūrin-in (十輪院)	5×4, single-storied, yosemune style, hongawarabuki roof	early Kamakura period	Nara, Nara; 34°40′35.08″N 135°49′59.48″E	Small wooden building with white walls.
Main Hall (本堂, hon-dō)	Shin-Yakushi-ji	7×5, single-storied, irimoya style, hongawarabuki roof	Nara period, 747	Nara, Nara; 34°40′33.35″N 135°50′46.19″E	Low and wide wooden building with white walls.
Shōsōin	Tōdai-ji	treasure house, oldest surviving example of the azekura log-cabin style with a raised floor, 9×3, 108.4 m × 30.5 m (356 ft × 100 ft), single-storied, yosemune style, hongawarabuki roof	Nara period, ca. 756	Nara, Nara; 34°41′31.11″N 135°50′18.84″E	Dark wooden building with raised floor on poles.
Main Hall (本堂, hon-dō) (Note: Three hidden ridges (野棟木, nomunagi) are attached to the nomination.)	Chōkyū-ji (長弓寺)	5×6, single-storied, irimoya style with a 1 ken step canopy, hinoki cypress bark shingles	late Kamakura period, 1279	Ikoma, Nara; 34°43′6.92″N 135°43′38.28″E	Wooden building with a raised floor, a hip-and-gable roof and an enclosing open railed veranda.
Main Hall (本堂, hon-dō) (Note: Attached to the nomination are: two munafuda (棟札) ridge tags with information on the building's construction; one broad concave almost rectangular roof tile (平瓦) from 1648; three pages of construction plans for the hon-dō; four pages of plans for the Hase-dera compound; a catalogue of the construction costs)	Hase-dera	Worship Hall (正堂, shōdō): 7×4, with a pent roof on the front and either side Ai-no-ma and Worship Hall (礼堂, raidō): 4×9, overhang style, entrance in gable ends, connected to the shōdō in the back side, chidori hafu bargeboards (Note: (chidori hafu, 千鳥破風, lit. "plover gable"): a decorative dormer bargeboard on triangular shaped dormers with strong concave curves) on either side, attached to a stage on the front side, hongawarabuki roof each structure is single-storied, irimoya style	early Edo period, 1650	Sakurai, Nara; 34°32′9.27″N 135°54′24.51″E	Wooden building with a large hip-and-gable roof built on a hillside. In front of the building there is a wooden railed platform.
Golden Hall (金堂, kon-dō) (Note: 22 construction parts are attached to the nomination.)	Tōshōdai-ji	7×4, 27.9 m × 14.6 m (92 ft × 48 ft), single-storied, yosemune style, hongawarabuki roof, principal hall, part of the World Heritage Site Historic Monuments of Ancient Nara	Nara period, 8th century	Nara, Nara; 34°40′32.23″N 135°47′5.43″E	Wooden building with white walls built on a stone platform.
Scripture House (経蔵, kyōzō)	Tōshōdai-ji	Buddhist sutra storehouse, 3×3, storehouse style (校倉, azekura), yosemune style, hongawarabuki roof, part of the World Heritage Site Historic Monuments of Ancient Nara	Nara period, 8th century	Nara, Nara; 34°40′32.22″N 135°47′7.9″E	Small and dark wooden building with raised floor on poles.
Korō (鼓楼)	Tōshōdai-ji	3×2, rō style, (Note: (rō-zukuri, 楼造): a high gate with a shallow veranda and balustrade which gives it the impression of a two-storied gate) irimoya style, hongawarabuki roof, with a drum for indicating the time, also served as a sutra repository, part of the World Heritage Site Historic Monuments of Ancient Nara	early Kamakura period, 1240	Nara, Nara; 34°40′33.05″N 135°47′6.25″E	Wooden building with white walls and a veranda with balustrade on the upper floor.
Lecture Hall (講堂, kōdō) (Note: Four frog leg struts (蟇股, kaerumata) and one pair of 高座.)	Tōshōdai-ji	9×4, single-storied, irimoya style, hongawarabuki roof; originally part of the Heijō Palace; now part of the World Heritage Site Historic Monuments of Ancient Nara	Nara period, 763	Nara, Nara; 34°40′33.36″N 135°47′5.43″E	Wooden building with white walls and a hip-and-gable roof built on a stone platform.
Treasure House (宝蔵, hōzō)	Tōshōdai-ji	3×3, storehouse style (校倉, azekura), yosemune style, hongawarabuki roof, part of the World Heritage Site Historic Monuments of Ancient Nara	Nara period	Nara, Nara; 34°40′32.91″N 135°47′7.91″E	Small and dark wooden building with raised floor on poles.
Founder's Hall (開山堂, kaizandō) (Note: One dais and a miniature shrine are attached to the nomination.)	Tōdai-ji	3×3, single-storied, hōgyō style, hongawarabuki roof, part of the World Heritage Site Historic Monuments of Ancient Nara	early Kamakura period, 1200 (inner temple), 1250	Nara, Nara; 34°41′20.65″N 135°50′36.56″E	Wooden building with pyramid shaped roof.
Golden Hall (金堂, kondō) or Great Buddha Hall (大仏殿, daibutsuden)	Tōdai-ji	5×5, 57 m × 50 m (187 ft × 164 ft), single-storied, yosemune style with a pent roof enclosure, hongawarabuki roof, karahafu gable on front side, copper-tile roofing; largest wooden building in the world, part of the World Heritage Site Historic Monuments of Ancient Nara	middle Edo period, 1705	Nara, Nara; 34°41′20.37″N 135°50′23.36″E	Huge wooden building with white walls and dark beams.
Belfry (鐘楼, shōrō)	Tōdai-ji	1×1, 7.6 m (25 ft) square, single-storied, irimoya style, hongawarabuki roof; part of the World Heritage Site Historic Monuments of Ancient Nara	early Kamakura period, Jōgen era	Nara, Nara; 34°41′19.81″N 135°50′31.33″E	Small wooden house with a hip-and gable roof. The structure is open from all sides and a large bell is hanging in the center.
Tegaimon (転害門)	Tōdai-ji	3 ken wide eight-legged gate with a 1 ken passage, kirizuma style, hongawarabuki roof, part of the World Heritage Site Historic Monuments of Ancient Nara	Nara period, around Tenpyō-hōji era	Nara, Nara; 34°41′29.84″N 135°50′6.29″E	Low and wide wooden gate with white walls and a gabled roof.
Nandaimon (南大門)	Tōdai-ji	large 5×2, 29 m × 11 m (95 ft × 36 ft), two-storied gate with entrances in the three central baysgate, irimoya style, hongawarabuki roof, part of the World Heritage Site Historic Monuments of Ancient Nara	early Kamakura period, 1199	Nara, Nara; 34°41′8.83″N 135°50′23.51″E	Large two-storied wooden gate with a hip-and-gable roof and passages in the three central bays.
Nigatsu-dō (二月堂)	Tōdai-ji	overhang style, 10×7, single-storied, yosemune style, hongawarabuki roof, part of the World Heritage Site Historic Monuments of Ancient Nara	middle Edo period, 1669	Nara, Nara; 34°41′21.39″N 135°50′39.33″E	Large wooden building with a pyramid shaped roof. Built on a hill slope with part of the building and veranda supported by poles.
Hokke-dō (法華堂) or Sangatsu-dō (三月堂)	Tōdai-ji	front 5 ken, side 8 ken, front irimoya style, back yosemune style, hongawarabuki roof, contains akadana (閼伽棚); part of the World Heritage Site Historic Monuments of Ancient Nara	Nara period, 747 (image hall (正堂, shōdō)) and 1199 (worship hall (礼堂, raidō))	Nara, Nara; 34°41′19.43″N 135°50′38.54″E	Wooden building with white walls, a raised floor with railed veranda and a hip-and-gable roof.
Scripture House (本坊経庫, honbōkyōko)	Tōdai-ji	Buddhist sutra storehouse, 3×2, storehouse style (校倉, azekura), yosemune style, hongawarabuki roof; part of the World Heritage Site Historic Monuments of Ancient Nara	Nara period	Nara, Nara; 34°41′9.33″N 135°50′26.04″E	
Rōmon (楼門)	Hannya-ji	1×1, two-storied gate, irimoya style, hongawarabuki roof	early Kamakura period, around Bun'ei era	Nara, Nara; 34°41′59.5″N 135°50′8″E	Small, high wooden gate with a railed veranda on the upper floor and a hip-and-gable roof.
Three-storied Pagoda (三重塔, sanjūnotō)	Hokki-ji	3×3, three-storied pagoda, hongawarabuki roof; part of the World Heritage Site Buddhist Monuments in the Hōryū-ji Area	Asuka period, 706	Ikaruga, Nara; 34°37′22.41″N 135°44′46.71″E	Wooden three-storied pagoda with white walls and railed verandas on the upper floors.
East Corridor (東廻廊, higashi kairō) and West Corridor (西廻廊, nishi kairō)	Hōryū-ji	42 ken (east corridor) and 40 ken (west corridor) long (with bends), single-storied, hongawarabuki roof; part of the World Heritage Site Buddhist Monuments in the Hōryū-ji Area	Asuka period, ca. 700	Ikaruga, Nara 34°36′51.71″N 135°44′5.1″E; 34°36′51.2″N 135°44′1.71″E	A semi-open wooden corridor with white walls.
Golden Hall (金堂, kondō) (Note: Part of the original framework is attached to the nomination.)	Hōryū-ji	5×4, double-storied, irimoya style with pent roof enclosure on first floor, hongawarabuki roof, wood shingles (pent roof); together with Hōryū-ji's five-storied pagoda one of the oldest wooden buildings in the world, principal hall, part of the World Heritage Site Buddhist Monuments in the Hōryū-ji Area	Asuka period, by 693	Ikaruga, Nara; 34°36′51.54″N 135°44′4.05″E	Large wooden building with a hip-and-gable roof, two enclosing pent roofs and an open gallery with handrail on the upper floor.
Scripture House (経蔵, kyōzō)	Hōryū-ji	Buddhist sutra storehouse, 3×2, rō style, kirizuma style, hongawarabuki roof; part of the World Heritage Site Buddhist Monuments in the Hōryū-ji Area	Nara period	Ikaruga, Nara; 34°36′52.52″N 135°44′1.82″E	Two-storied wooden building with white walls and an attached open veranda with handrail on the upper floor.
Five-storied Pagoda (五重塔, gojūnotō)	Hōryū-ji	3×3, five-storied pagoda with a pent roof enclosure on the first level, hongawarabuki roof, wood shingles (pent roof); together with Hōryū-ji's kon-dō one of the oldest wooden buildings in the world, at 50 m (160 ft) second tallest pagoda in Japan, part of the World Heritage Site Buddhist Monuments in the Hōryū-ji Area	Asuka period, ca. 703	Ikaruga, Nara; 34°36′51.38″N 135°44′2.81″E	Wooden five-storied pagoda with white walls. Below the first roof, there is an additional attached pent roof.
Kōfūzō (綱封蔵)	Hōryū-ji	large storehouse, 9×3, single-storied, raised floor, yosemune style, hongawarabuki roof; part of the World Heritage Site Buddhist Monuments in the Hōryū-ji Area	early Heian period	Ikaruga, Nara; 34°36′51.98″N 135°44′7.54″E	Wooden building with white walls on poles.
Three Sutra Hall (三経院, sankyōin) and West Dormitory (西室, nishimuro)	Hōryū-ji	19×(5 (front) or 4 (back)), single-storied, kirizuma style, entrance in gable ends, hongawarabuki roof, attached hisashi in front, with a 1 ken step canopy covered with hinoki cypress bark shingles; part of the World Heritage Site Buddhist Monuments in the Hōryū-ji Area	early Kamakura period, 1231	Ikaruga, Nara; 34°36′51.17″N 135°44′0.33″E	Long wooden building with an open veranda with handrail.
Belfry (鐘楼, shōrō)	Hōryū-ji	3×2, rō style, kirizuma style, hongawarabuki roof, part of the World Heritage Site Buddhist Monuments in the Hōryū-ji Area	middle Heian period, 1005–1020	Ikaruga, Nara; 34°36′52.87″N 135°44′4.52″E	Two-storied wooden building with white walls and an attached open veranda with handrail on the upper floor.
Refectory (食堂, jikidō)	Hōryū-ji	7×4, single-storied, kirizuma style, hongawarabuki roof, part of the World Heritage Site Buddhist Monuments in the Hōryū-ji Area	Nara period	Ikaruga, Nara; 34°36′53.02″N 135°44′7.91″E	Wooden building with white walls and gabled roof next to a similar building.
Shōryō-in (聖霊院)	Hōryū-ji	6×5, single-storied, kirizuma style, entrance in gable ends, hongawarabuki roof, attached hisashi in front, with a 1 ken step canopy covered with hinoki cypress bark shingles; hall dedicated to the soul of Prince Shōtoku, part of the World Heritage Site Buddhist Monuments in the Hōryū-ji Area	Kamakura period, 1284	Ikaruga, Nara; 34°36′51.39″N 135°44′5.96″E	Wooden building with open railed veranda, gabled roof and an attached step canopy.
West Octagonal Hall (西円堂, saiendō) (Note: One beam of the former roof skeleton and two munafuda (棟札) ridge tags with information on the building's construction are attached to the nomination.)	Hōryū-ji	octagonal hall, single-storied, hongawarabuki roof, part of the World Heritage Site Buddhist Monuments in the Hōryū-ji Area	early Kamakura period, 1250	Ikaruga, Nara; 34°36′52.78″N 135°43′58.93″E	A small wooden octagonal building with white walls on a stone platform.
Large Lecture Hall (大講堂, daikōdō)	Hōryū-ji	9×4, 33.8 m × 16.5 m (111 ft × 54 ft), single-storied, irimoya style, hongawarabuki roof, oldest extant building with a hidden roof; part of the World Heritage Site Buddhist Monuments in the Hōryū-ji Area	middle Heian period, 990	Ikaruga, Nara; 34°36′53.22″N 135°44′3.03″E	Wide and low wooden building with white walls and a hip-and gable roof.
Inner Gate (中門, chūmon)	Hōryū-ji	4×3 two-storied gate with entrance through the two central bays, irimoya style, hongawarabuki roof; part of the World Heritage Site Buddhist Monuments in the Hōryū-ji Area	Asuka period, ca. 700	Ikaruga, Nara; 34°36′50.41″N 135°44′3.51″E	Large two-storied gate with a hip-and-gable roof and a railed open veranda on the upper floor. There are two guardian statues on either side of the passage.
Belfry (鐘楼, shōrō)	Hōryū-ji (East Precinct (東院, tōin))	3×2, flared skirt like lower part (袴腰, hakamagoshi), irimoya style, hongawarabuki roof; part of the World Heritage Site Buddhist Monuments in the Hōryū-ji Area	early Kamakura period	Ikaruga, Nara; 34°36′52.75″N 135°44′19.18″E	Small wooden tower shaped structure with a flared lower part and a hip-and-gable roof.
Denpōdō (伝法堂)	Hōryū-ji (East Precinct (東院, tōin))	7×4, single-storied, kirizuma style, hongawarabuki roof; lecture hall, part of the World Heritage Site Buddhist Monuments in the Hōryū-ji Area	Nara period	Ikaruga, Nara; 34°36′53.1″N 135°44′19.93″E	
Hall of Dreams (夢殿, yumedono)	Hōryū-ji (East Precinct (東院, tōin))	Large octagonal hall housing the famous Guze Kannon, single-storied, each side 4.2 m (14 ft) long, hongawarabuki roof; part of the World Heritage Site Buddhist Monuments in the Hōryū-ji Area	Nara period, 739	Ikaruga, Nara; 34°36′51.91″N 135°44′20.19″E	Large octagonal wooden building with white walls.
East Dormitory (東室, higashimuro)	Hōryū-ji	12×4, single-storied, kirizuma style, hongawarabuki roof; living quarters for high-ranking priests, part of the World Heritage Site Buddhist Monuments in the Hōryū-ji Area	Nara period	Ikaruga, Nara; 34°36′52.2″N 135°44′5.89″E	Long wooden building with white walls.
Tōdaimon (東大門)	Hōryū-ji	3 ken wide eight-legged gate, kirizuma style, hongawarabuki roof; main east gate, part of the World Heritage Site Buddhist Monuments in the Hōryū-ji Area	Nara period	Ikaruga, Nara; 34°36′49.89″N 135°44′12.08″E	Wooden gate with white walls, red beams and a gabled roof.
Nandaimon (南大門) (Note: One ridge pole and one munafuda (棟札) ridge tag with information on the building's construction are attached to the nomination.)	Hōryū-ji	3 ken wide eight-legged gate, irimoya style, hongawarabuki roof; main south gate, part of the World Heritage Site Buddhist Monuments in the Hōryū-ji Area	middle Muromachi period, 1438	Ikaruga, Nara; 34°36′45.89″N 135°44′4.26″E	Wooden gate with white walls and a hip-and-gable roof.
Tōindō (東院堂) (Note: One broad concave almost rectangular roof tile (平瓦) is attached to the nomination.)	Yakushi-ji	7×4, single-storied, irimoya style, hongawarabuki roof; meditation hall, rebuilt in 1285, oldest of its kind in Japan, part of the World Heritage Site Historic Monuments of Ancient Nara	late Kamakura period, 1285	Nara, Nara; 34°40′4.64″N 135°47′6.66″E	Wooden building with white walls and a slightly raised floor.
East Pagoda (東塔, tōtō)	Yakushi-ji	3×3 three-storied pagoda, each level with a pent roof enclosure; part of the World Heritage Site Historic Monuments of Ancient Nara	Nara period, 730	Nara, Nara; 34°40′5.18″N 135°47′4.88″E	Three storied wooden pagoda with white walls. Additional pent roofs on every floor give the appearance of twice as many floors, i.e. six floors.
Main Hall (本堂, hon-dō)	Ryōsen-ji	5×6, single-storied, irimoya style, with a 1 ken step canopy, hongawarabuki roof	late Kamakura period, 1283	Nara, Nara; 34°40′25.01″N 135°44′32.46″E	Wooden building with hip-and-gable roof, slightly raised floor, white walls and an open railed veranda.
Octagonal Hall (八角堂, hakkakudō) (Note: Remains of the former dew basin at the bottom of the finial are attached to the nomination.)	Eisan-ji	octagonal hall, single-storied, hongawarabuki roof	Nara period, Tenpyō-hōji era, 8th century	Gojō, Nara; 34°21′21.25″N 135°43′16.22″E	
West Pagoda (西塔, saitō)	Taima-dera	3×3 three-storied pagoda, hongawarabuki roof	early Heian period, 9th century	Katsuragi, Nara; 34°30′55.49″N 135°41′40.24″E	Wooden three-storied pagoda with white walls and dark beams.
East Pagoda (東塔, tōtō)	Taima-dera	3×3 three-storied pagoda, hongawarabuki roof	early Nara period, 8th century	Katsuragi, Nara; 34°30′55.13″N 135°41′44.58″E	Two pagodas on a mountain slope.
Main Hall (本堂, hondō) or Mandaradō (曼荼羅堂)	Taima-dera	7×6, single-storied, yosemune style, hongawarabuki roof, houses a large (39.7 cm x 39.1 cm) Mandala, contains an akadana (閼伽棚)	late Heian period, 1161	Katsuragi, Nara; 34°30′57.83″N 135°41′40.91″E	Wide and low wooden building with trapezoidal roof, raised floor, white walls and a railed veranda.
Tahōtō (多宝塔)	Kongō Sanmai-in	3×3, two-storied Buddhist tower, hinoki cypress bark shingles	early Kamakura period, 1223	Kōya, Wakayama; 34°12′34.95″N 135°35′13.9″E	A two-storied pagoda shaped tower with a square base and a round upper story. The walls are faded white and the beams faded red.
Fudōdō (不動堂)	Kongōbu-ji	3×4, single-storied, irimoya style, with 1 (3) ken hisashi attached to the right (left) side, with a 1 ken step canopy, hinoki cypress bark shingles; hall dedicated to the deity Fudō Myōō	early Kamakura period	Kōya, Wakayama; 34°12′47.17″N 135°34′49.43″E	Wooden building with a hip-and-gable roof and step canopy. A shorter aisle is attached to the right side.
Tahōtō (多宝塔) or Daitō (大塔)	Negoro-ji	5×5, large two-storied Buddhist tower, hongawarabuki roof	late Muromachi period, Meiō era–Tenbun era	Iwade, Wakayama; 34°17′16.36″N 135°19′2.76″E	A large two-storied pagoda shaped tower with a square base and a round upper story. The walls are white and the beams faded red.
Shakadō (釈迦堂)	Zenpuku-in (善福院)	3×3, pent roof enclosure, yosemune style, hongawarabuki roof; hall in which a statue of the historical Buddha is enshrined	late Kamakura period, 1327	Kainan, Wakayama; 34°7′50.12″N 135°10′38″E	Wooden building with added pent roof enclosure.
Tahōtō (多宝塔)	Chōhō-ji	3×3, two-storied Buddhist tower	early Muromachi period, 1357	Kainan, Wakayama; 34°6′32.21″N 135°9′56.85″E	Small wooden two-storied pagoda shaped building with a square base and a round upper floor.
Daimon (大門) (Note: One framed motto (扁額, hengaku) is attached to the nomination.)	Chōhō-ji	rōmon, irimoya style, hongawarabuki roof	early Muromachi period, 1388	Kainan, Wakayama; 34°6′28.12″N 135°9′55.87″E	
Main Hall (本堂, hon-dō)	Chōhō-ji	5×5, single-storied, irimoya style with a 1 ken step canopy, hongawarabuki roof	late Kamakura period, 1311	Kainan, Wakayama; 34°6′32.77″N 135°9′56.34″E	Wooden building with slightly raised floor, white walls and a hip-and-gable roof.
Three-storied Pagoda (三重塔, sanjūnotō)	Kōjō-ji (向上寺)	3×3, three-storied pagoda, hongawarabuki roof	middle Muromachi period, 1432	Onomichi, Hiroshima; 34°18′24.81″N 133°5′12.04″E	Three-storied pagoda with white walls and red beams. There are railed verandas on the two upper stories.
Tahōtō (多宝塔) (Note: A sutra inserted in the pagoda finial is attached to the nomination.)	Jōdo-ji	3×3, two-storied Buddhist tower, hongawarabuki roof	late Kamakura period, 1328	Onomichi, Hiroshima; 34°24′42.54″N 133°12′39.53″E	Wooden two-storied pagoda shaped building with a square base and a round upper floor, white walls and red beams.
Main Hall (本堂, hon-dō) (Note: One miniature shrine, two munafuda (棟札) ridge tags with information on the building's construction and two pages of a compound map are attached to the nomination.)	Jōdo-ji	5×5, single-storied, irimoya style with a 1 ken step canopy, hongawarabuki roof	late Kamakura period, 1327	Onomichi, Hiroshima; 34°24′43.39″N 133°12′39.05″E	Wooden building with raised floor, white walls, red beams, a hip-and-gable roof and a canopy over the staircase.
Golden Hall (金堂, kon-dō)	Fudō-in (不動院)	3×4, pent roof enclosure, irimoya style, hinoki cypress bark shingles; principal hall	late Muromachi period, 1540	Hiroshima; 34°25′37.25″N 132°28′16.02″E	Large wooden building with a hip-and-gable roof and an enclosing pent roof.
Five-storied Pagoda (五重塔, gojūnotō)	Myōō-in	3×3, 4.4 m (14 ft), 29.1 m (95 ft) tall, five-storied pagoda, hongawarabuki roof	early Muromachi period, 1348	Fukuyama, Hiroshima; 34°28′41.82″N 133°20′45.15″E	Five-storied pagoda with white walls and red beams.
Main Hall (本堂, hon-dō) (Note: One miniature shrine and three munafuda (棟札) ridge tags with information on the building's construction are attached to the nomination.)	Myōō-in	5×5, 11.8 m × 11.8 m (39 ft × 39 ft) single-storied, irimoya style with a 1 ken step canopy, hongawarabuki roof	late Kamakura period, 1321	Fukuyama, Hiroshima; 34°28′42.56″N 133°20′45.17″E	Wooden building with white walls, red beams and a hip-and-gable roof.
Buddha Hall (仏殿, butsuden)	Kōzan-ji	3×3, irimoya style, pent roof enclosure, hinoki cypress bark shingles	late Kamakura period, 1320	Shimonoseki, Yamaguchi; 33°59′44.16″N 130°58′54.42″E	Large wooden building with and added enclosing pent roof.
Five-storied Pagoda (五重塔, gojūnotō) (Note: One square bearing block is attached to the nomination.)	Rurikō-ji	3×3, five-storied pagoda, hinoki cypress bark shingles	middle Muromachi period, 1442	Yamaguchi, Yamaguchi; 34°11′24.65″N 131°28′22.5″E	Five-storied wooden pagoda with white walls.
Main Hall (本堂, hondō) (Note: Three miniature shrines and part of a ridge pole are attached to the nomination.)	Motoyama-ji	5×5, single-storied, yosemune style with a 3 ken step canopy, hongawarabuki roof	late Kamakura period, 1300	Mitoyo, Kagawa; 34°8′22.91″N 133°41′38.74″E	Small wooden building with a trapezoidal roof.
Niō Gate (二王門, niōmon)	Ishite-ji	3 ken wide rōmon, irimoya style, hongawarabuki roof	late Kamakura period, 1318	Matsuyama, Ehime; 33°50′51.11″N 132°47′47.58″E	Small wooden gate with two guardian statues in the outer bays.
Main Hall (本堂, hon-dō)	Taisan-ji	7×9, 16.4 m × 21 m (54 ft × 69 ft), single-storied, irimoya style, hongawarabuki roof; largest esoteric Buddhist hall	late Kamakura period, 1305	Matsuyama, Ehime; 33°53′6.05″N 132°42′53.86″E	Wooden building with a hip-and-gable roof.
Main Hall (本堂, hon-dō) (Note: One miniature shrine and one munafuda (棟札) ridge tag with information on the building's construction are attached to the nomination.)	Taihō-ji	3×4, single-storied, yosemune style, hongawarabuki roof	late Kamakura period	Matsuyama, Ehime; 33°50′30.37″N 132°44′31.88″E	
Yakushi Hall (薬師堂, yakushidō)	Buraku-ji (豊楽寺)	5×5, single-storied, irimoya style, hinoki cypress shingles	late Heian period, 1151	Ōtoyo, Kōchi; 33°47′31.35″N 133°43′37.93″E	Wooden building with a hip-and-gable roof.
Great Leader's Treasure Hall (大雄宝殿, daiyūhōden)	Sōfuku-ji	5×4, two-storied, irimoya style, hongawarabuki roof	early Edo period, 1646	Nagasaki; 32°44′33.14″N 129°53′0.56″E	Wooden building painted red with a hip-and-gable roof.
Daiippōmon (第一峰門)	Sōfuku-ji	four-legged Chinese style gate, irimoya style, hongawarabuki roof	early Edo period, 1644	Nagasaki; 32°44′33.55″N 129°52′59.88″E	Small wooden gate painted in red, green and blue. Boards with Chinese characters are attached to the gate.
Ōdō (大堂) (Note: Part of a former ridge pole is attached to the nomination.)	Fuki-ji	3×4, single-storied, hōgyō style, hongawarabuki roof with smooth, lipless, semi-cylindrical cover tiles (行基葺, gyōgibuki)	late Heian period	Bungotakada, Ōita; 33°32′16.45″N 131°31′42.79″E	Simple wooden building with slightly raised floor and pyramid shaped roof.
