= Chōkō-ji =

Buddhist temple in Hyōgo Prefecture, Japan

Coordinates: 34°55′57″N 135°02′38″E

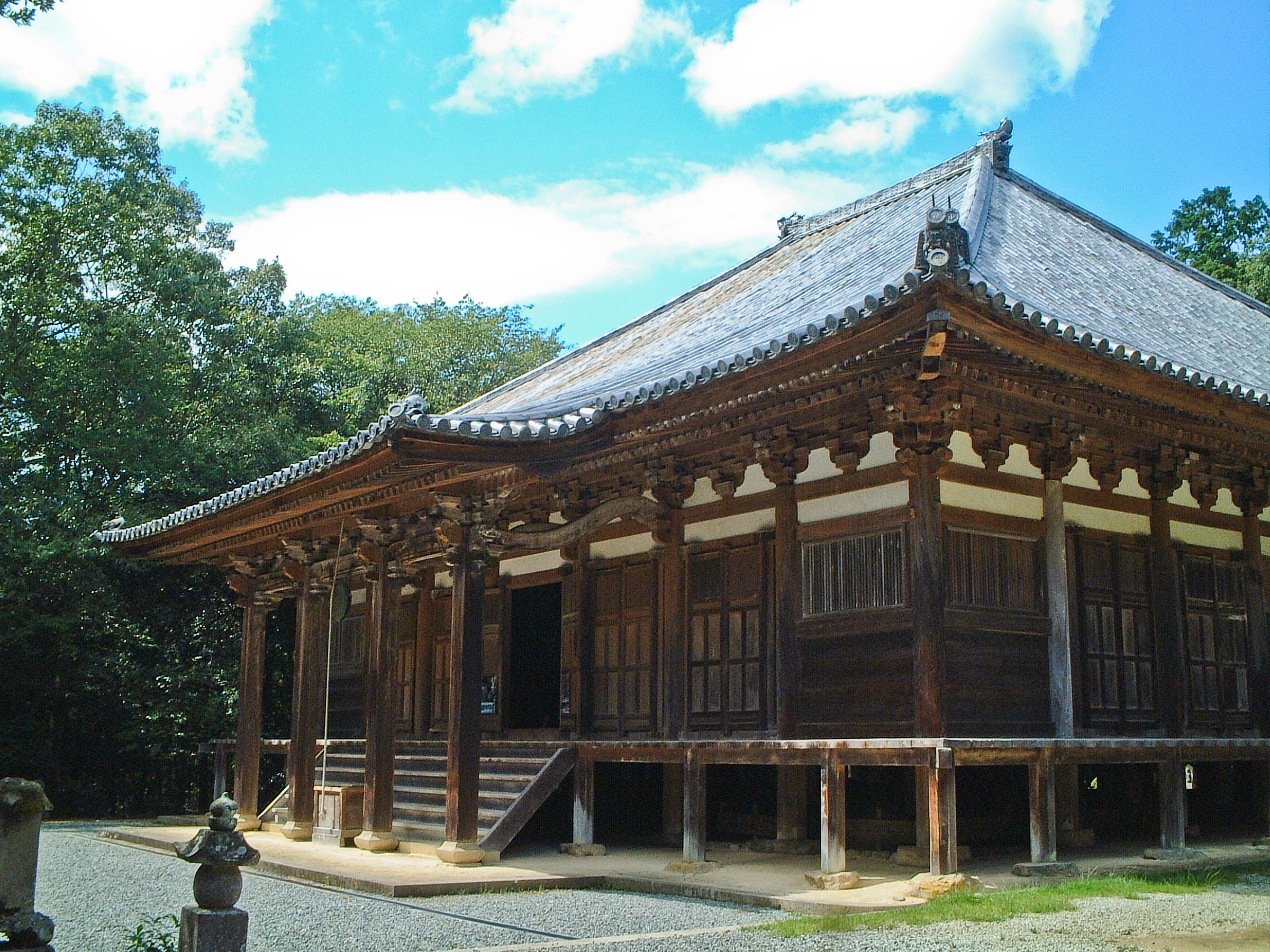
The Main Hall, A National Treasure

Chōkō-ji (朝光寺 Chōkōji) is a Buddhist temple, in Yashiro, Hyōgo Prefecture, Japan.

== History ==
According to the official record of the temple, this temple was originally constructed on Mount Gongen in the 7th century, by Hodo-Shonin. In 1185, the temple moved to today's place. On the sutra of this temple, it is written that the Buddhist altar and the main sculpture of the Buddha was made in 1413.

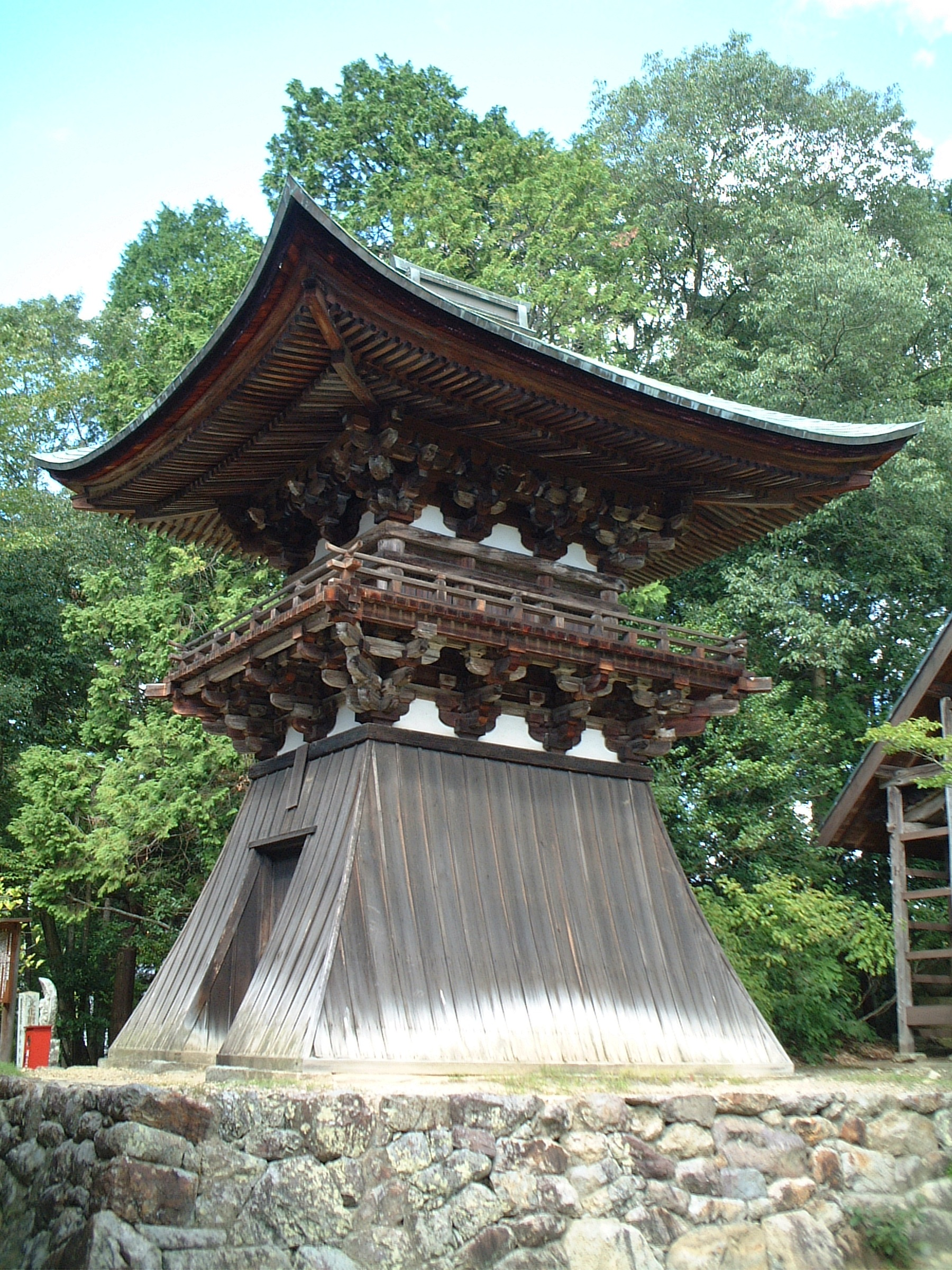
The Belfry, an Important Cultural Property

== Cultural properties ==
This temple has one National Treasure and one Important Cultural Property designated by the Japanese government.

=== National Treasures ===
- The Main Hall

=== Important Cultural Property ===
- The Belfry

== See also ==
- List of National Treasures of Japan (Temples)
