= Kōzan-ji (Shimonoseki) =

Buddhist temple in Shimonoseki, Japan

Kinzan Kōzan-ji
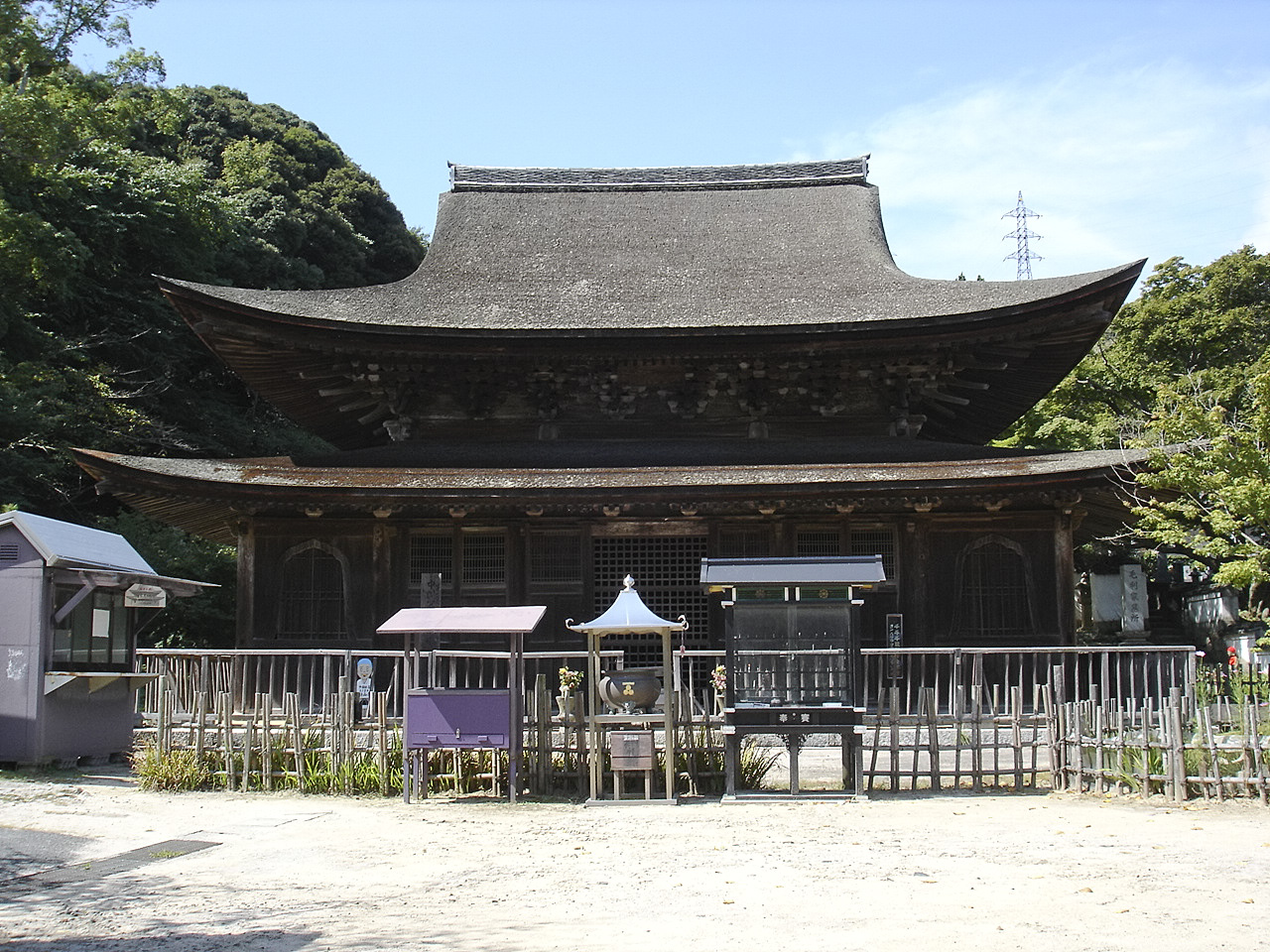
- Butsuden

Religion
- Affiliation: Rinzai

Location
- Location: 1-2-3, Kawabata, Chofu, Shimonoseki, Yamaguchi Prefecture, Japan
- Country: Japan
- Interactive map of Kinzan Kōzan-ji
- Coordinates: 33°58′37″N 130°57′42″E

Architecture
- Founder: Kyoan Genjaku
- Completed: 1327

Website
- https://web.archive.org/web/20091201030220/http://npweb.com/kouzanji/

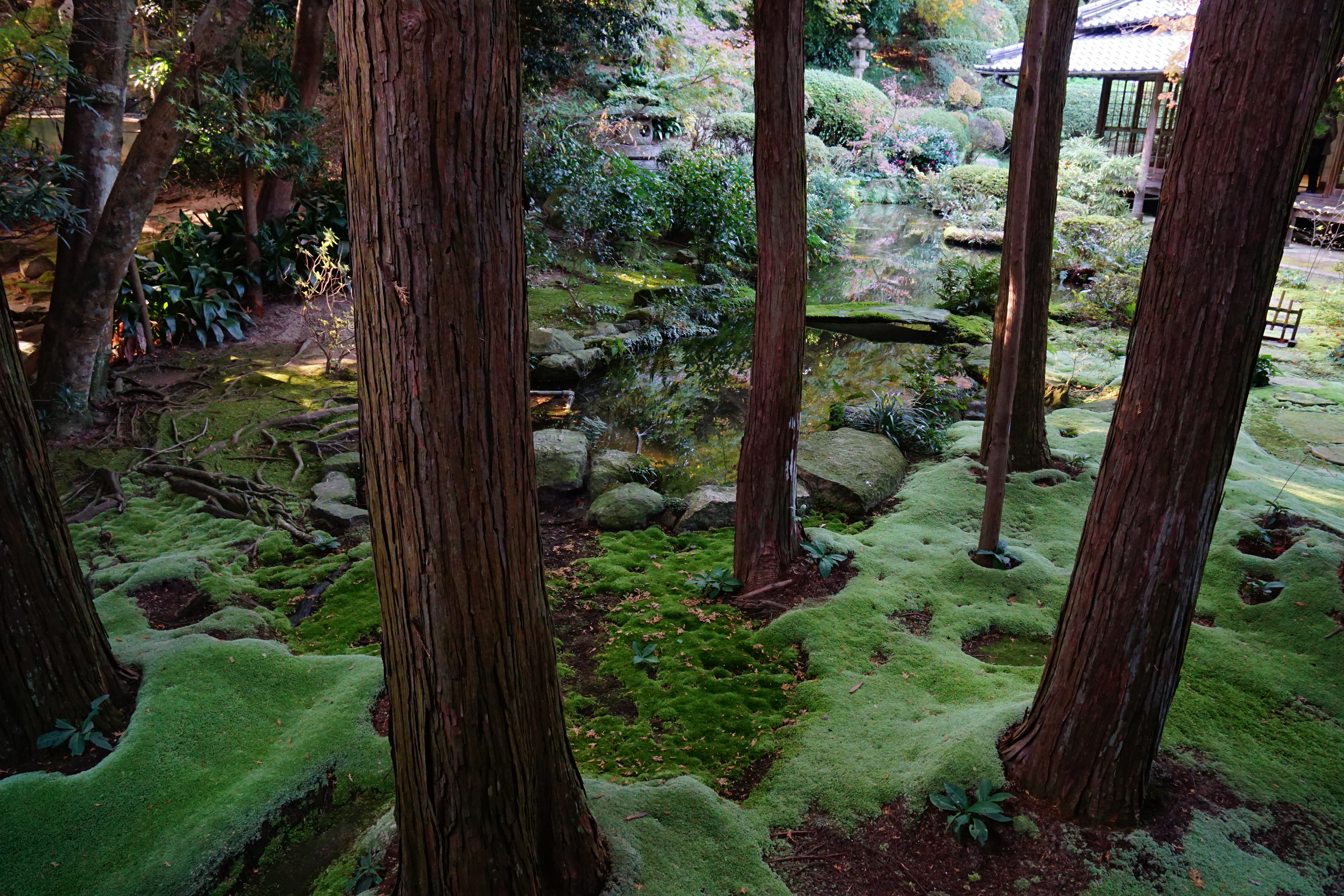
Shoin Garden

The Kinzan Kōzan-ji (金山功山寺) is a temple of the Sōtō school of Zen faction in Shimonoseki, Yamaguchi Prefecture, Japan. It was first established as a temple of the Rinzai school by Kyoan Genjaku in 1327 of the late Kamakura era.

Kōzan-ji's Butsuden, completed in 1320, is a National Treasure of Japan. This architecture in Zenshūyō (禅宗様) (aka Zen'yō) style (Zen style), combining Japanese and Chinese Buddhist design features. It is the oldest building designed in the Zenshūyō style that exists in Japan.

The Chūgoku 33 Kannon Pilgrimage No.19.

== Building list ==
- Butsuden - National Treasure of Japan. It was built in 1320.
- Sanmon - It was rebuilt in 1773.
- Shoin
- Hattō
- Kyōzō - It was rebuilt in 1799.

== See also ==
- National Treasures of Japan
  - List of National Treasures of Japan (temples)
