= Kakurin-ji (Kakogawa) =

Buddhist temple in Kakogawa, Hyōgo Prefecture, Japan

Coordinates: 34.7523°N 134.833°E

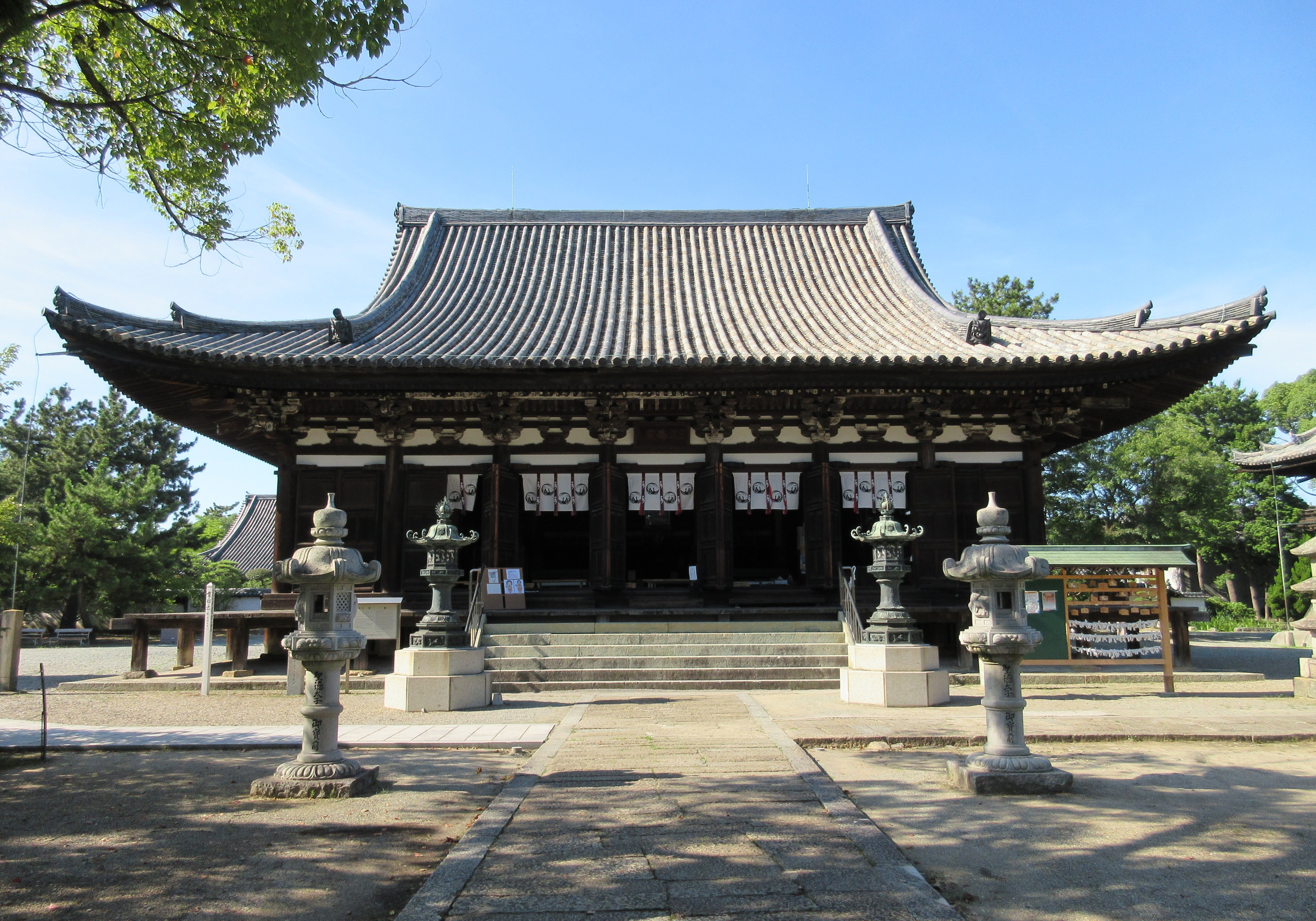
Main Hall

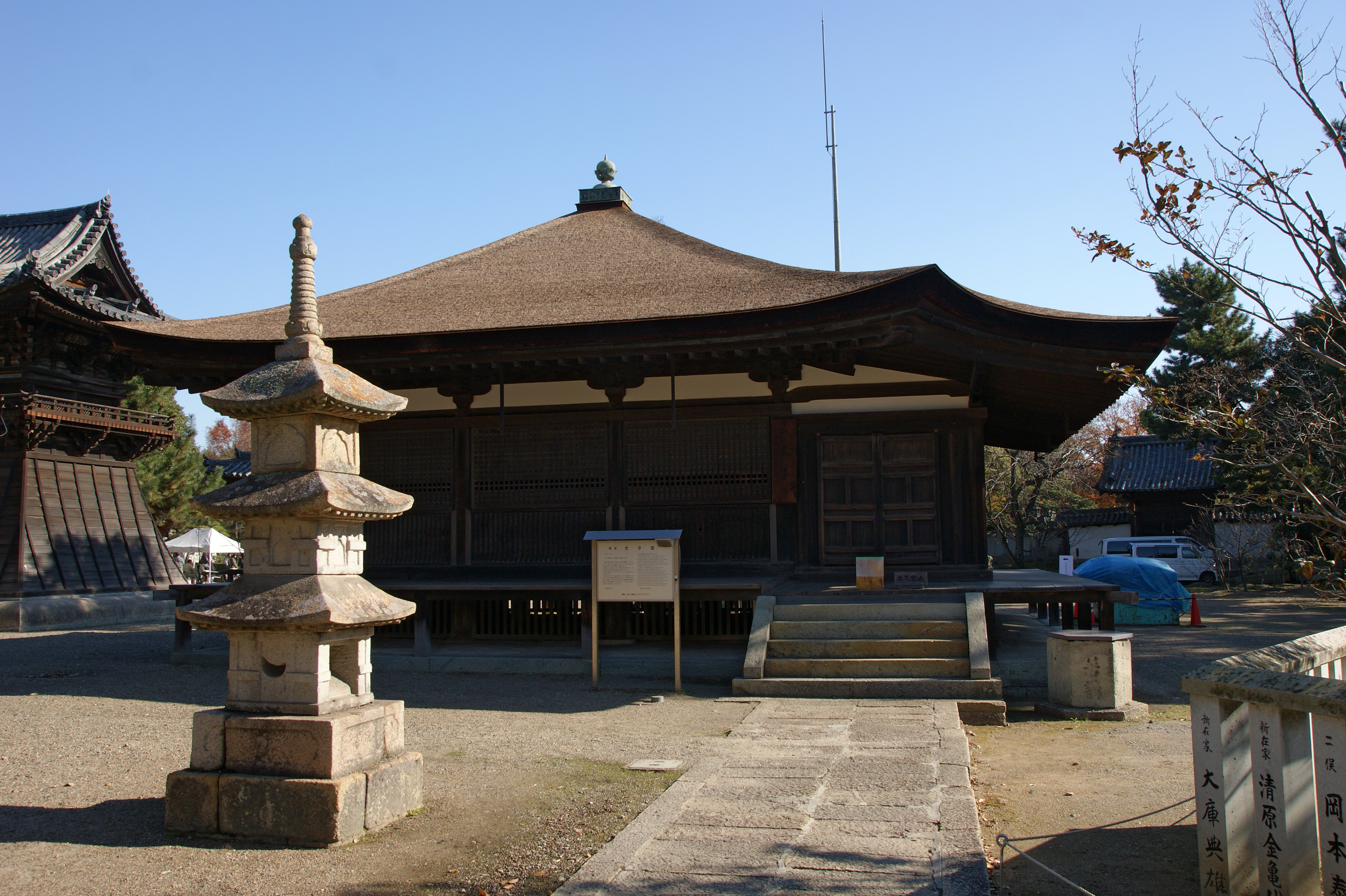
Taishidō

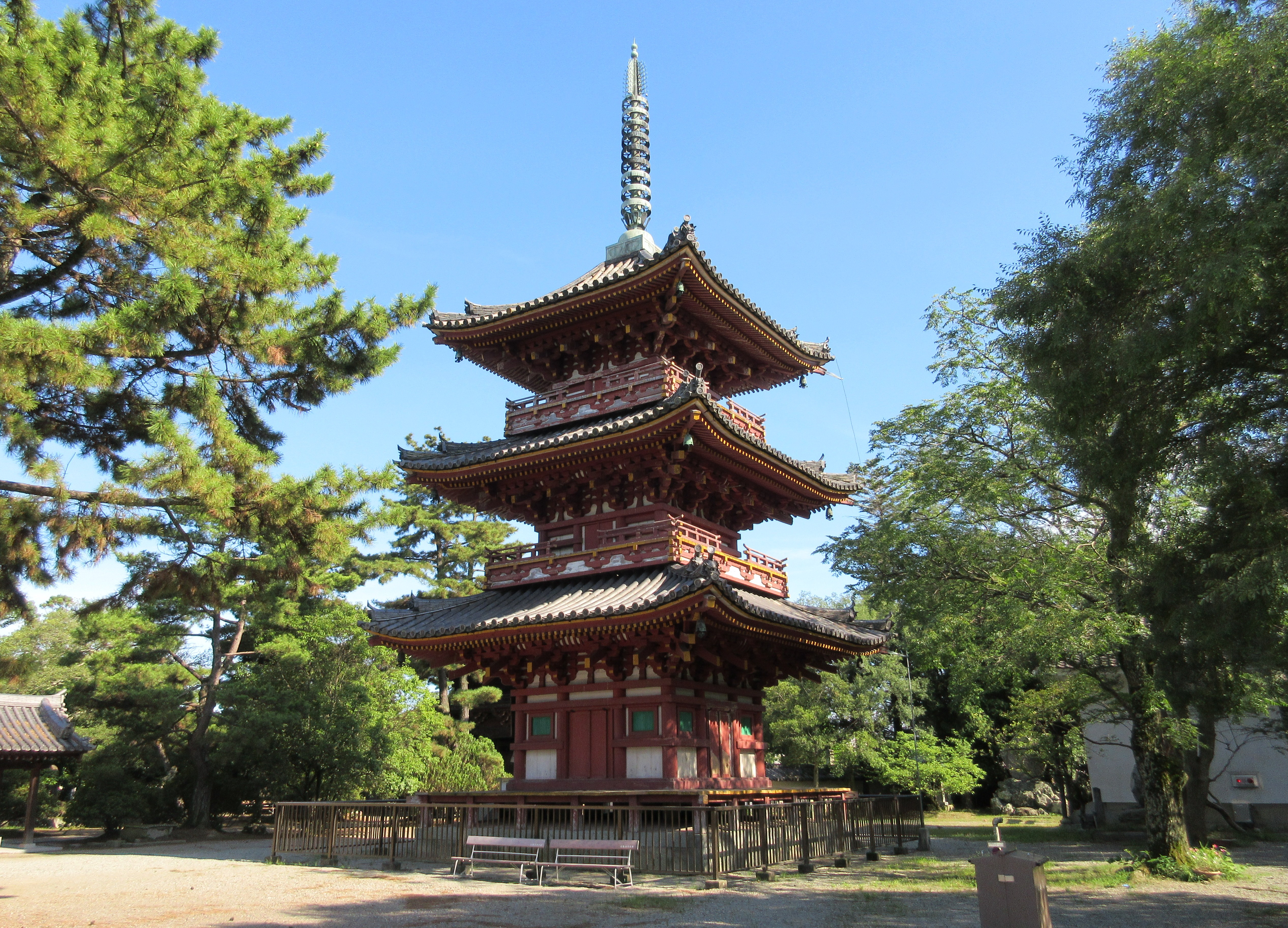
Pagoda

The Totasan Kakurin-ji (刀田山鶴林寺) is a temple of the Tendai sect in Kakogawa, Hyōgo, Japan. It was established by Prince Shōtoku's instruction in 589.

Kakurin-ji's Taishidō was completed in 1112, and Main Hall was finished in 1397. Both are National Treasures of Japan.

== Building list ==
- Taishidō - National Treasure of Japan. It was built in 1112.
- Main Hall - National Treasure of Japan. It was built in 1397.
- Jōgyōdō - Important Cultural Property of Japan. It was built in Heian period.
- Gyōjadō - Important Cultural Property of Japan. It was built in 1406.
- Bell tower - Important Cultural Property of Japan. It was built in 1407.
- Gomadō - Important Cultural Property of Japan. It was built in 1563.
- Pagoda - It was built in Muromachi period.
- Sanmon - It was built in 1672.
- Kannondō - It was built in 1705.
- Kodō
- Shin-Yakushidō

== See also ==
- National Treasures of Japan
  - List of National Treasures of Japan (temples)
- Historical Sites of Prince Shōtoku
