= Jōraku-ji =

Buddhist temple in Shiga Prefecture, Japan

- 常楽寺
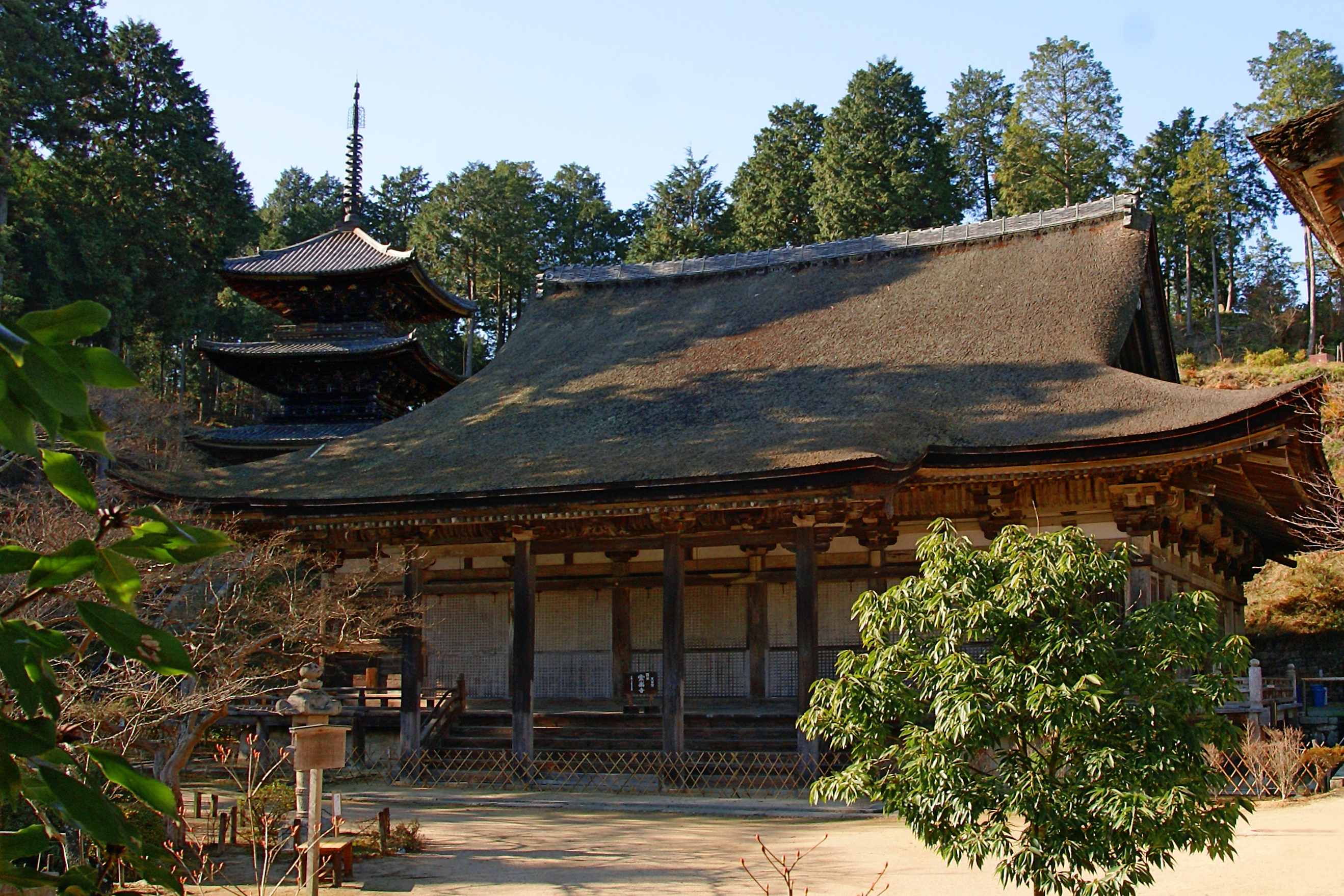
- Jōraku-ji Main Hall and Pagoda (NT)

- Jōraku-ji Jōraku-ji (Japan)

Religion
- Affiliation: Buddhist
- Deity: Senjū Kannon
- Rite: Tendai

Location
- Location: 6-5-1 Nishidera, Konan-shi, Shiga-ken 520-3121
- Country: Japan
- Interactive map of Jōraku-ji
- Coordinates: 34°59′24.45″N 136°2′54.84″E

Architecture
- Founder: c. Empress Genmei
- Completed: c. 708–715

Website
- Official website

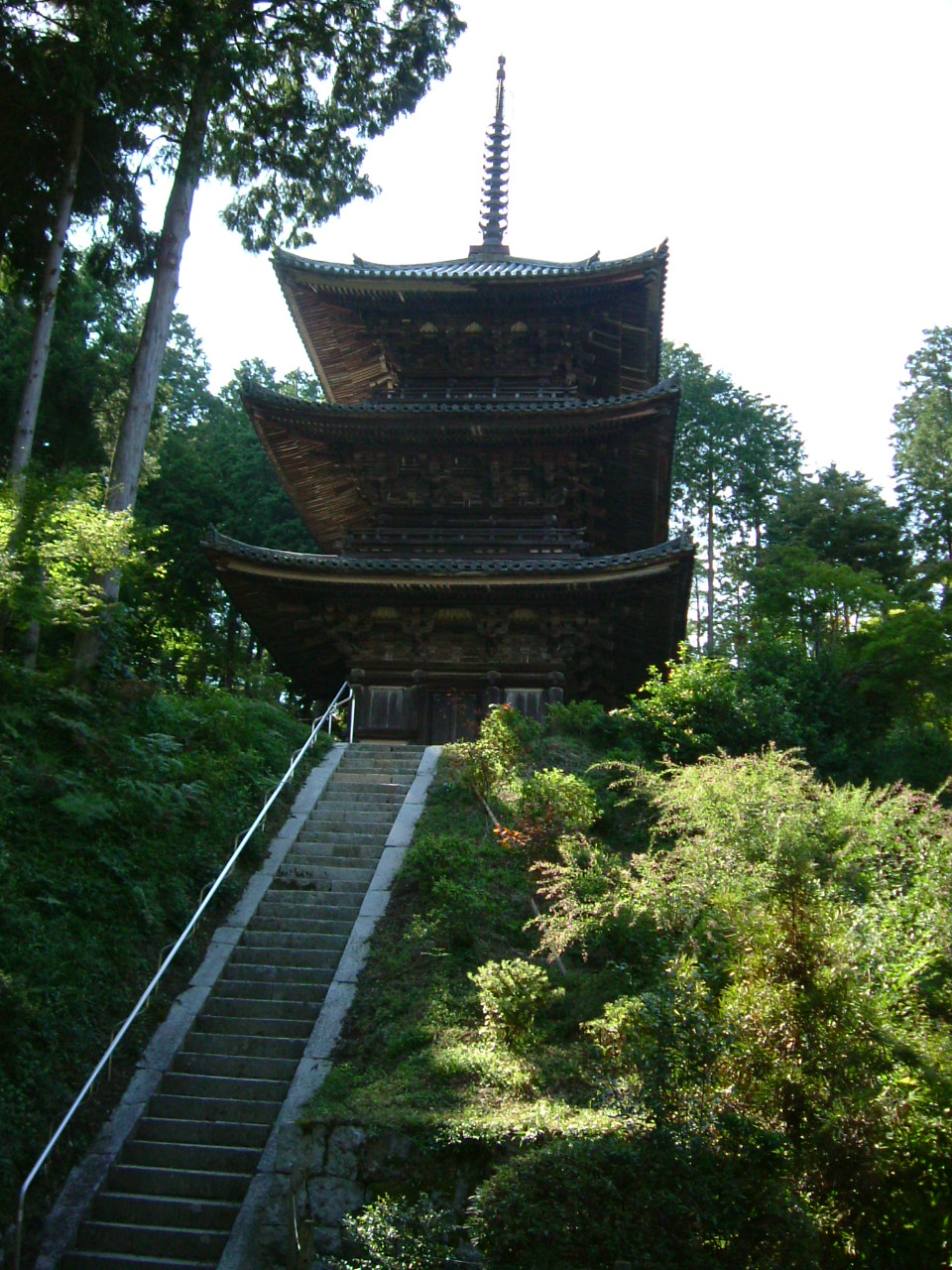
Three-story Pagoda (NT)

Jōraku-ji (常楽寺) is a Buddhist temple in the city of Konan, Shiga Prefecture, Japan. It belongs to the Tendai school of Japanese Buddhism. Its main image is a hibutsu statue of Senjū Kannon. Its Hondō and Three-story Pagoda are both National Treasures.: It is also referred to as Nishi-dera (西寺), whereas the temple of Chōjū-ji (長寿寺) is referred to as Higashi-dera (東寺).

== History ==
The history of Jōraku-ji is uncertain, as the documentary evidence of its foundation has been lost. The temple's legend states that it was founded by Rōben at the request of Empress Genmei during the Wadō era (708–715), into order to project the spiritually vulnerable northeastern quadrant from Shigaraki Palace. It was changed to the Tendai sect during the Enryaku era (782-806). Throughout the Heian and Kamakura periods, the temple enjoyed the patronage of successive emperors. Jōraku-ji was destroyed by a fire in 1360, but was soon rebuilt. In the Sengoku period, followers of the Ikkō-ikki movement made the area around what is now the city of Moriyama as their stronghold. Oda Nobunaga sent Sakuma Nobumori at the head of an army to destroy the movement, and Sakuma made Jōraku-ji his field headquarters. The temple impressed the young Toyotomi Hideyoshi, who later removed its Niōmon gate (built in 1452) for use in Fushimi Castle. It was later relocated again by Tokugawa Ieyasu to Mii-dera in 1601, where it remains to this day.

The temple is the first stop in the Ōmi Saigoku Sanjusankasho (近江西国三十三箇所) a pilgrimage route founded in 1734 modeled after the Saigoku Kannon Pilgrimage, but with all 33 temples located in Ōmi Province.

The temple is ten-minutes by car from Ishibe Station on the JR West Kusatsu Line.

== Cultural Properties ==
- The Main Hall (Hondō) of Jōraku-ji was built in the Nanboku-chō period and was completed in either 1360. It is in the irimoya-zukuri-style and is a seven by six bay building with a hinoki cypress bark shingled roof. The building was designated a National Treasure in 1953
- The Three-story Pagoda was reconstructed in 1400. The building is a three by three bay structure with tiled roofs. It was designated a National Treasure in 1953

The temple also has a number of statues which are National Important Cultural Properties

- Shaka Nyōrai, Heian-period
- Senjū Kannon (honzon of the temple), Nanboku-cho period,
- Set of 28 Avatars of Kannon (of which two a missing, and have been replaced by statues of Fūjin and Raijin; Kamakura period

== See also ==
- List of National Treasures of Japan (temples)
