= Taihō-ji (Matsuyama) =

Buddhist temple in Ehime Prefecture, Japan

Coordinates: 33°50′30″N 132°44′32″E

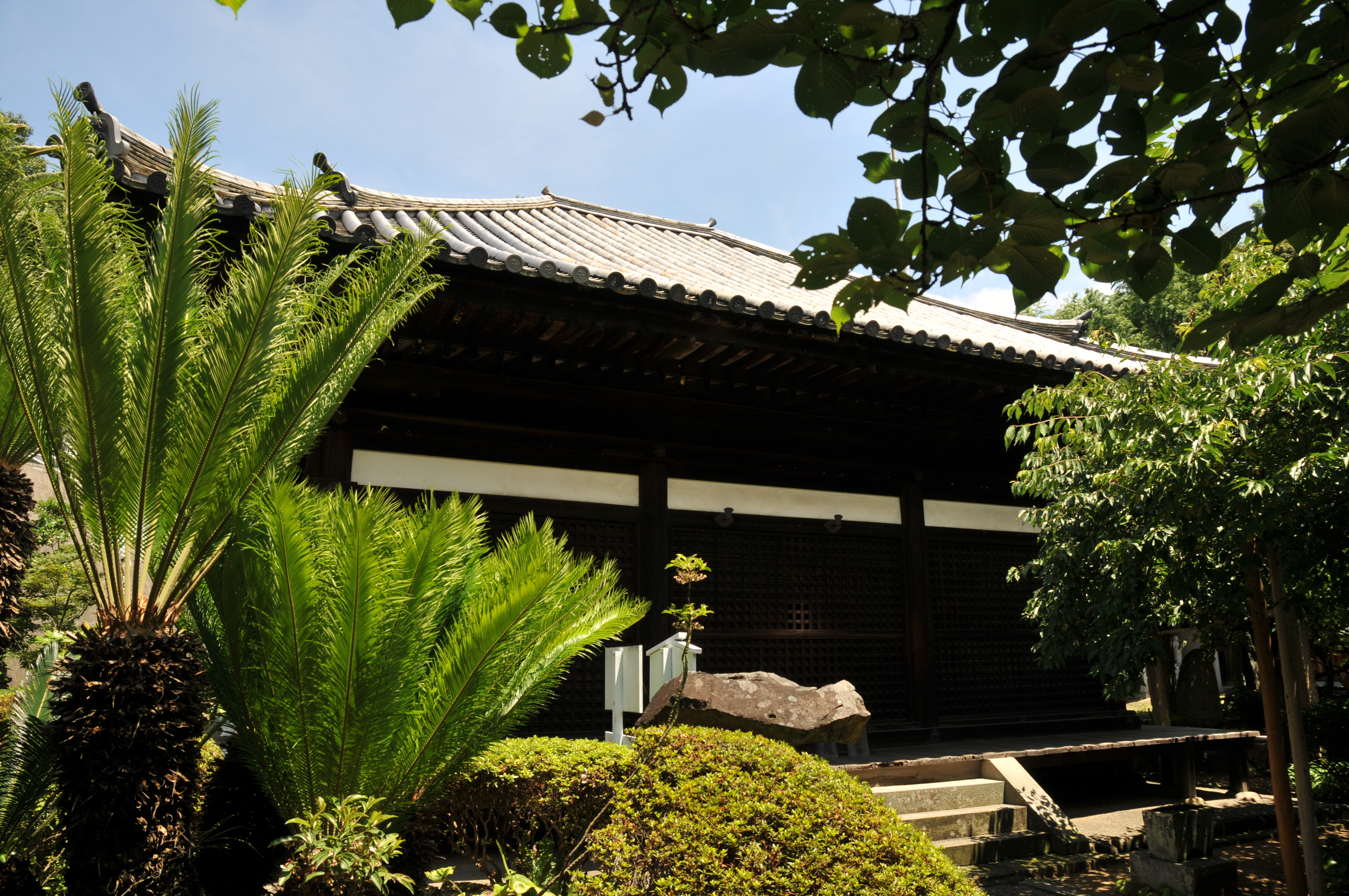
Taihō-ji Hondō (Kamakura period), a National Treasure

Taihō-ji (大宝寺) is a Buddhist temple in Matsuyama, Ehime Prefecture, Japan. The Hondō has been designated a National Treasure and a number of the temple's treasures are Important Cultural Properties.

== Buildings ==
- Hondō (early Kamakura period), National Treasure

== Treasures ==
- Seated wooden statue of Amida Nyorai (木造阿弥陀如来坐像) (Heian period) (Important Cultural Property)
- Seated wooden statue of Amida Nyorai (木造阿弥陀如来坐像) (Heian period) (ICP)
- Seated wooden statue of Shaka Nyorai (木造釈迦如来坐像) (Heian period) (ICP)

== See also ==
- List of National Treasures of Japan (temples)
