= Aoki, Nagano =

Aoki 青木村
- Village
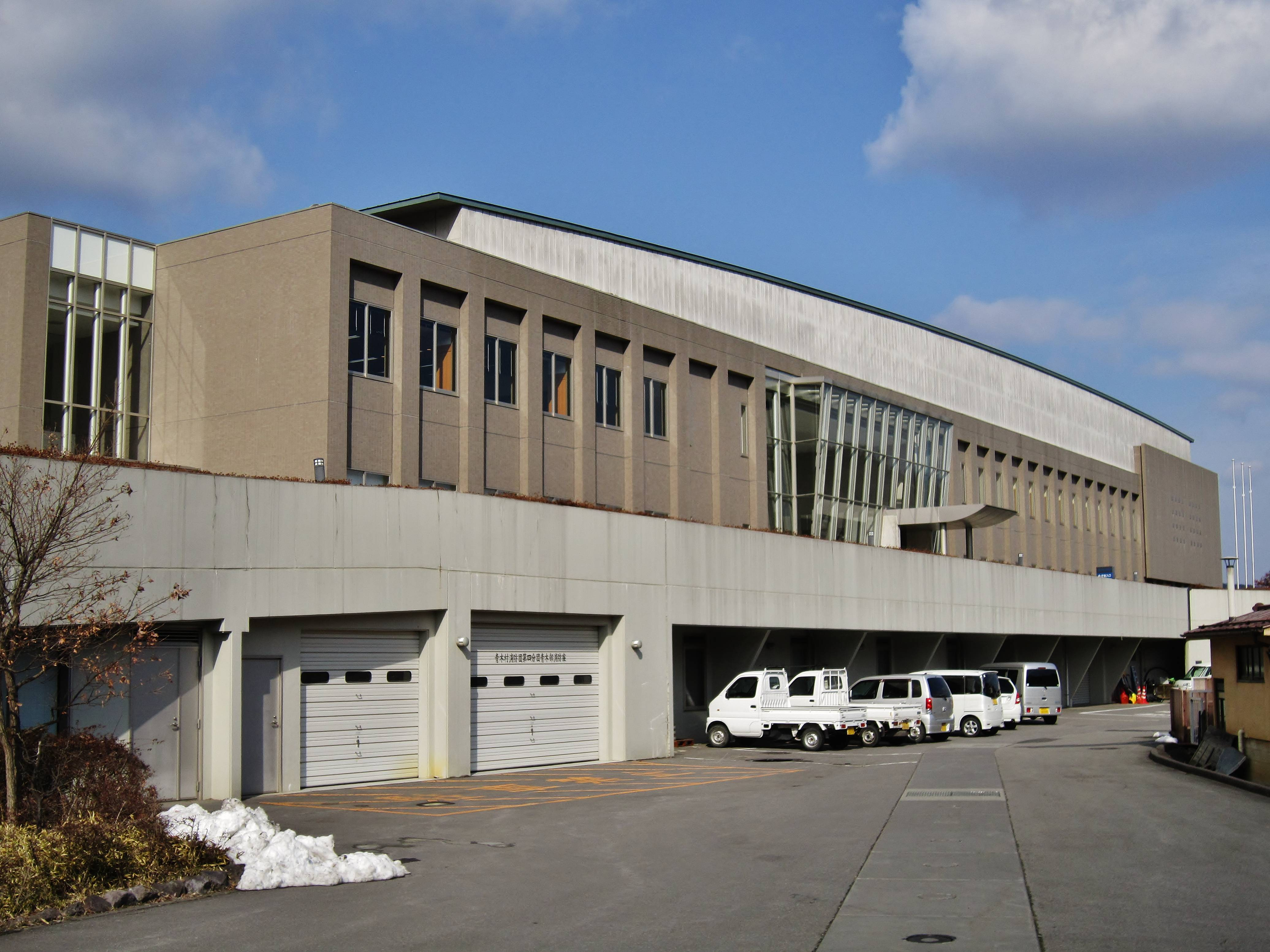
- Aoki Village Hall

- Flag Seal

- Location of Aoki in Nagano Prefecture

- Coordinates: 36°22′11.9″N 138°7′42.7″E
- Country: Japan
- Region: Chūbu (Kōshin'etsu)
- Prefecture: Nagano
- District: Chiisagata

Area
  - Total: 57.10 km^{2} (22.05 sq mi)

Population (February 2019)
  - Total: 4,360
  - Density: 76.4/km^{2} (198/sq mi)
- Time zone: UTC+9 (Japan Standard Time)
- Symbols
  - Tree: Juniperus rigida
  - Flower: Iris sanguinea
  - Bird: Green pheasant
  - Fish: Salvelinus
- Phone number: 0268-49-0111
- Address: 111 Tarawa, Aoki-mura, Chiisagata-gun, Nagano-ken 386-1601
- Website: Official website

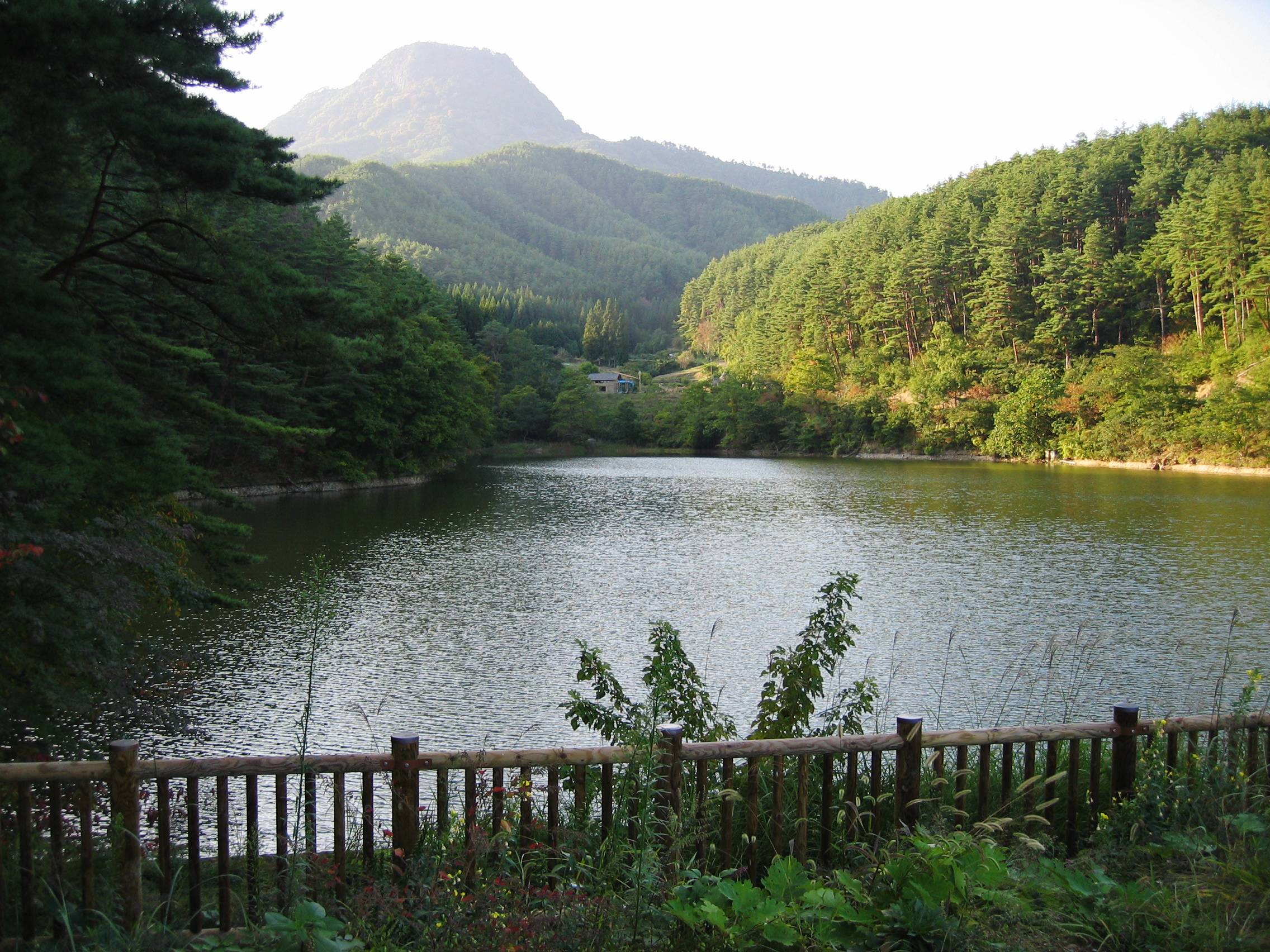
Shionoiri Pond in Aoki

Aoki (青木村, Aoki-mura) is a village in Nagano Prefecture, Japan. As of 28 February 2019, the village had an estimated population of 4,360 in 1742 households, and a population density of 76 persons per km^{2}. The total area of the village is 57.10 square kilometres (22.05 sq mi).

== Geography ==
Aoki is located in the center of Nagano Prefecture, in a basin surrounded by mountains on three sides. The village is at an average elevation of between 500 and 850 meters, with approximately 80% of the village area covered in mountains and forests. Around 10% of the village area is agricultural, with rice, mushrooms and horticulture as the main agricultural activities.

=== Climate ===
The village has a climate characterized by hot and humid summers, and cold winters (Köppen climate classification Cfa). The average annual temperature in Aoki is 10.8 °C. The average annual rainfall is 1103 mm with September as the wettest month. The temperatures are highest on average in August, at around 24.1 °C, and lowest in January, at around −1.8 °C.

=== Surrounding municipalities ===
- Nagano Prefecture
  - Chikuhoku
  - Matsumoto
  - Ueda

== Demographics ==
Per Japanese census data, the population of Aoki has been declining over the past 60 years.

Historical population
Year	Pop.	±%
1960	6,306	—
1970	5,532	−12.3%
1980	5,245	−5.2%
1990	5,004	−4.6%
2000	4,937	−1.3%
2010	4,610	−6.6%
2020	4,121	−10.6%

== History ==
The area of present-day Aoki was part of ancient Shinano Province. The area was part of the holdings of Ueda Domain during the Edo period. The modern village of Aoki was established on April 1, 1889 by the establishment of the municipalities system. A proposal to merge with the neighboring city of Ueda was rejected by voters in 2002.

== Education ==
Aoki has one public elementary school and one public middle school. The village does not have a high school.

== Transportation ==
=== Railway ===
Since the discontinuation of the Ueda Onsen Electric Railway's Aoki Line in 1938, the village has not had passenger railway service.

=== Highway ===
- National Route 143

== Sister City relations ==
- - Nagaizumi, Shizuoka, Japan
- - Namche Bazaar, Nepal
- - Shōbu, Saitama, Japan

== Local attractions ==
- Daihō-ji, a Buddhist temple with a three-story pagoda that is a National Treasure of Japan
- Tazawa Onsen

== Notable people from Aoki ==
- Keita Gotō - industrialist
