= Myōō-in =

Buddhist temple in Hiroshima Prefecture, Japan

Coordinates: 34.4787°N 133.346°E

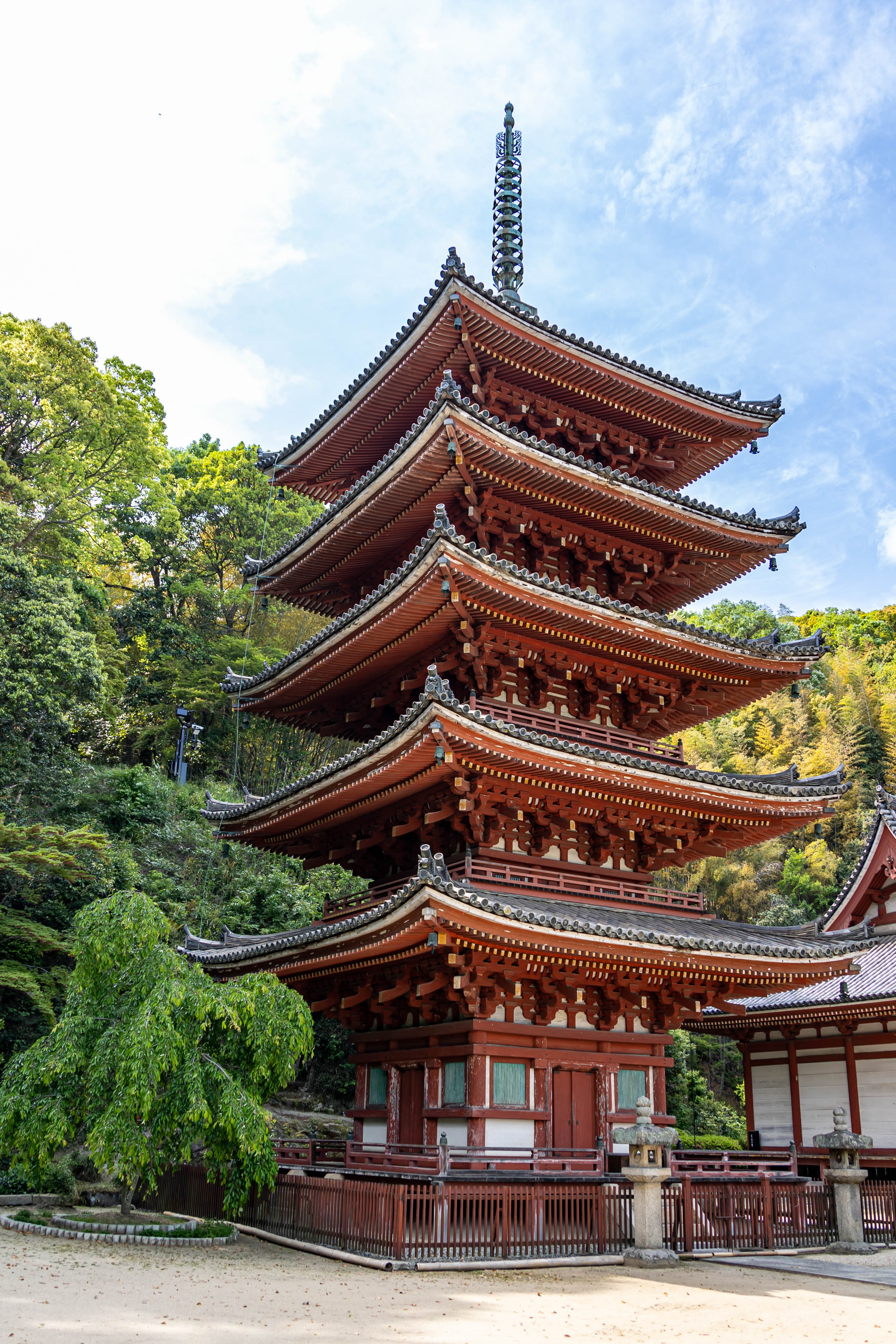
Myōō-in, the five-storied pagoda, A National Treasure

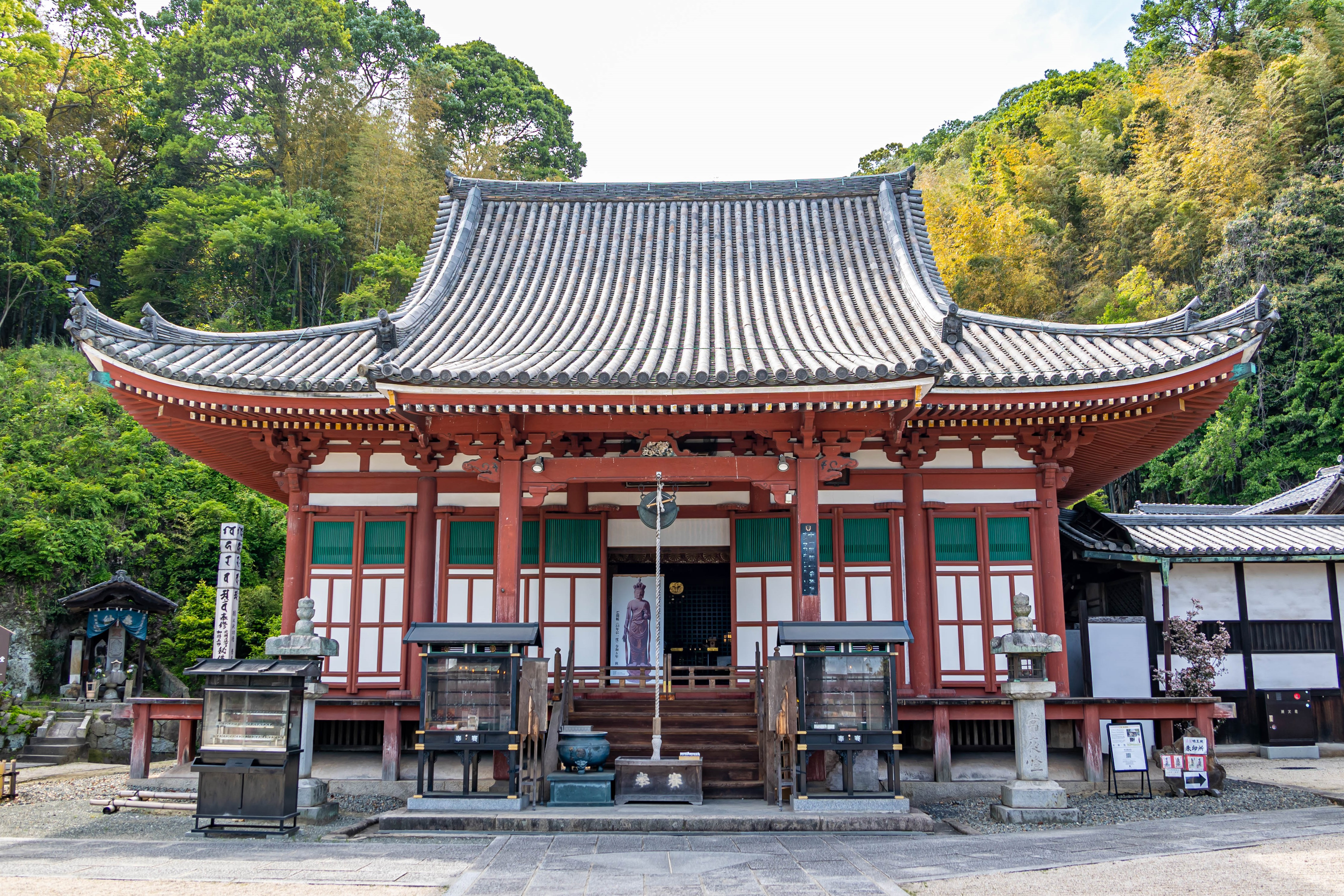

Myōō-in (明王院) is a Buddhist temple in Fukuyama, Hiroshima, Japan.

== History ==
Kūkai states that the Risshū or "Vinaya School", one of the Nanto Rokushū, constructed this temple in 807. The original name of the temple was Jōfuku-ji (常福寺).

The major object of worship at this temple, a statue of Eleven-Faced Kannon (Juchimen-Kannon), is estimated to have originated in the early years of the Heian period and no doubt was extant in the 9th century.

During the Edo period, this temple changed its sect affiliation and name to fall under the protection of the Mizuno clan, a clan of daimyōs in the region.

Today, the temple belongs to the Daikakuji-ha of Shingon Buddhism (真言宗大覚寺派).

== Object of Worship ==
- Juchimen-Kannon – estimated to be carved in the 9th century

== Cultural Properties ==
This temple has two National Treasures and one Important Cultural Property as selected by Japanese government.

=== National Treasures ===
- The Main Hall – constructed in 1321
- Five Story Pagoda – constructed in 1348

=== Important Cultural Properties ===
- Juichimen-Kannon

== Access ==
- Kusadouenocho Bus Stop of Tomotetsu Bus
