= Statue of Yakushi Nyorai (Gangō-ji) =

Statue of Bhaisajyaguru from Gango-ji, Nara, National Treasure

Standing Statue of Yakushi Nyorai
- (木造薬師如来立像 元興寺)
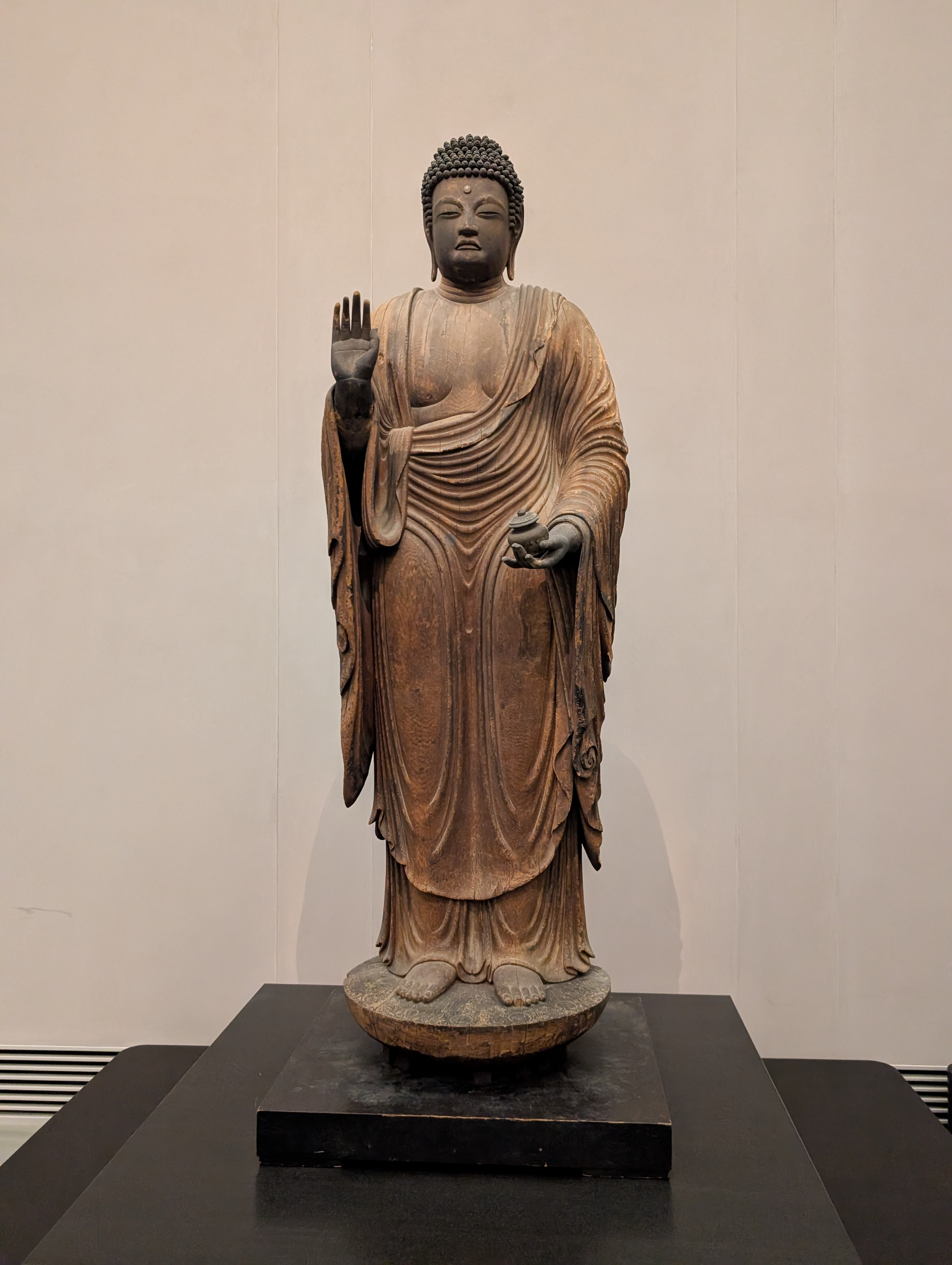
- The statue on display at the Nara National Museum's Buddhist Sculpture Hall, Room 6 (May 2026)
- Type: Japanese Buddhist Sculpture
- Material: Kaya wood
- Height: 164.8 cm (64.9 in)
- Created: Gangō-ji, Heian period, 9th century
- Present location: Nara National Museum
- Classification: National Treasure
- Identification: 00058

The Statue of Yakushi Nyorai of Gangō-ji (Japanese: 木造薬師如来 元興寺, Hepburn: Mokuzō Yakushi Nyorai Gangō-ji) is a 9th-century wooden Japanese Buddhist sculpture from the Heian period depicting a standing figure of Bhaisajyaguru, the Medicine Buddha. Once a part of the pagoda at Gangō-ji, it is now a part of the Nara National Museum's Buddhist Sculpture Hall, and is designated a National Treasure of Japan.

== Provenance ==
Gangō-ji, considered one of the Seven Great Temples of Nara, served as the main temple of Soga no Umako, who established the institution at Asuka before it transplanted itself to its present location in Nara (Heijō-kyō) during the Nara period.

The temple's campus originally saw the primary worship of Shakamunyi, Amitābha, Maitreya (Miroku Bosatsu), and Bhaisajyaguru (Yakushi Nyorai), with the relocation primarily focused on Miroku (in the main hall) and Yakushi Nyorai (in the lecture hall). Multiple statues of Yakushi Nyorai were erected in the temple during the Heian period, including this sculpture.

Gangō-ji saw periods of sect splitting and the sculpture was part of the facility's Kegon sect, to which the statue then served as the principal image of its 49-meter tall five-storied pagoda (8th century). Its history prior to its deposit remains unknown.

In 1859 (Ansei 6), a fire broke during the middle of the renovation of the pagoda, burning it down to the ground. The Yakushi Nyorai statue was housed inside at the time. Local tradition stated that a local monk from the neighboring temple of Renjo-ji rescued the statue, and while carrying it prayed "If you wish to be saved, please take hold of my shoulder", to which the sculpture became light enough to be carried out of the blaze.

In 1899, the sculpture was deposited under joint ownership of the Nara National Museum, where it has been since (primarily displayed in Room 6 of its Buddhist Sculpture Hall).

As a masterpiece of Heian period sculpture, it gained the status of Important Cultural Property in 17 April 1902, and was subsequently upgraded to National Treasure status in 22 November 1952.

== Description ==
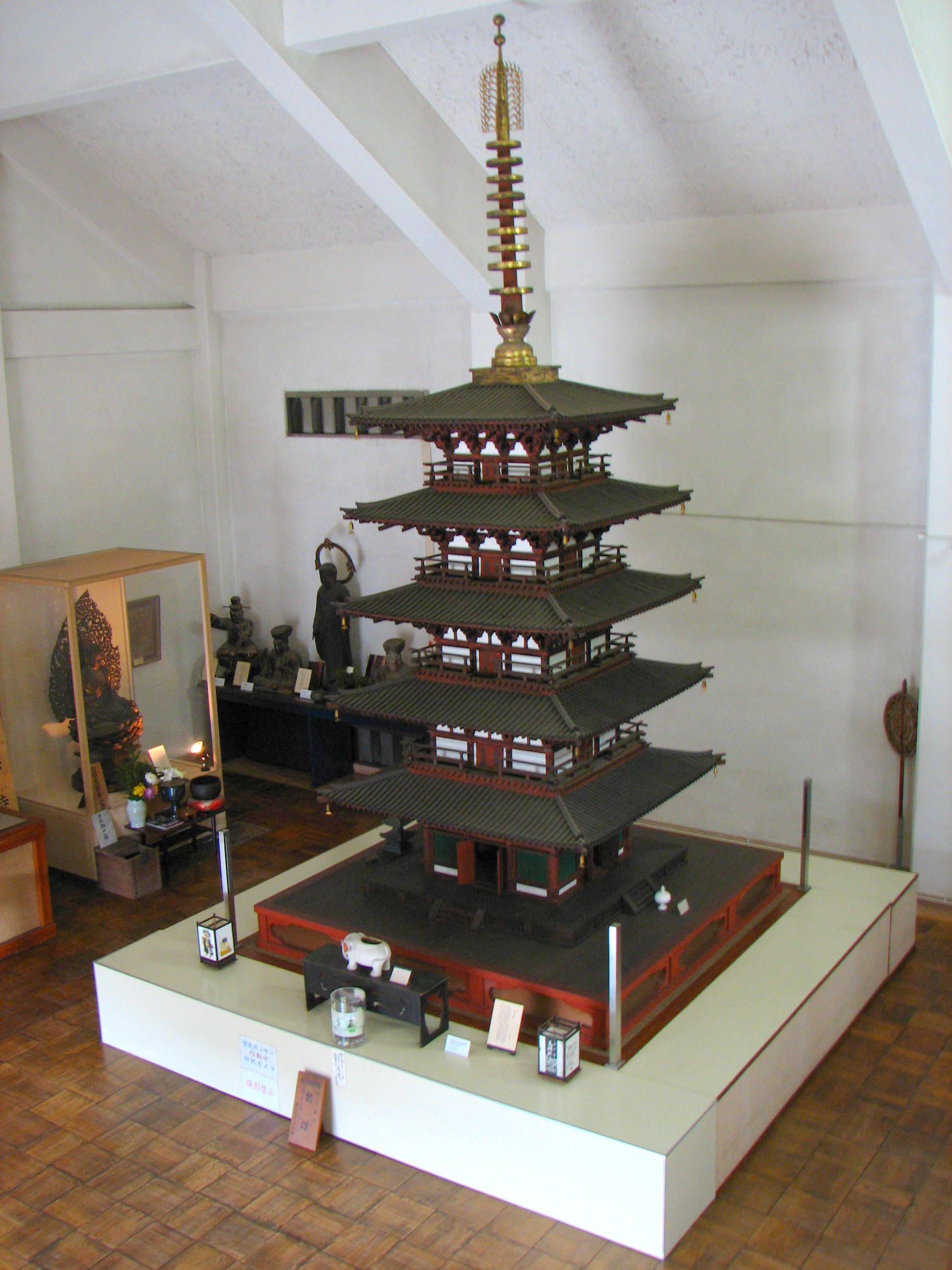
Miniaturized model of the Gangō-ji pagoda, which once held the statue (Nara Period, National Treasure)

The Yakushi Nyorai statue stands at a height of 164.8 cm and is carved from a single block (ichiboku-zukuri) of kaya wood (Torreya nucifera), down to the lotus base with its back hollowed out, with exceptions to the fingertips and hair curls. It was once painted, but the pigment has since faded and has since returned to its undyed state. This rendition of Yakushi emphasizes on broad shoulders, and volume to the abdomen and thighs, its presence accentuated by the waviness and swirls of the robes, representative of late-Nara period aesthetic.

Contemporary to its time would be the Yakushi Nyorai of Tōshōdai-ji, as well as that of the Yakushi Nyorai of Jingo-ji in Kyoto.

== See Also ==
- List of National Treasures of Japan (sculptures)
