= Historic Monuments of Ancient Nara =

UNESCO World Heritage Site in Japan

UNESCO World Heritage Site
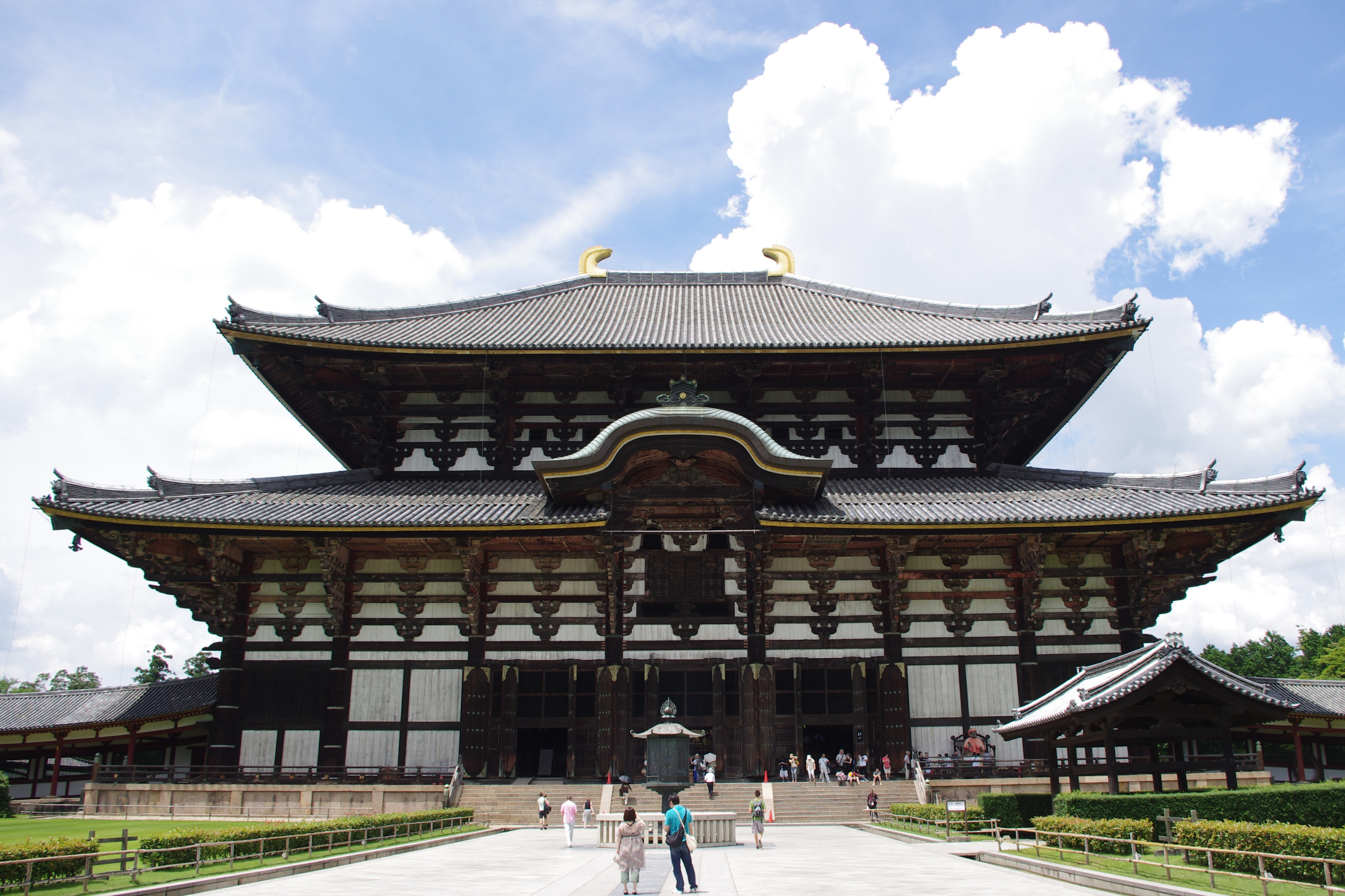
- Great Buddha Hall of Todaiji

- Location within Japan
- Location: Nara Prefecture, Kansai region, Japan
- Criteria: Cultural: (ii), (iii), (iv), (vi)
- Reference: 870
- Inscription: 1998 (22nd Session)
- Area: 617 ha (1,520 acres)
- Buffer zone: 1,962.5 ha (4,849 acres)
- Coordinates: 34°40′32″N 135°50′22″E

Historic Monuments of Ancient Nara is a UNESCO World Heritage Site consisting of eight places in the old capital Nara in Nara Prefecture, Japan. Five are Buddhist temples, one is a Shinto shrine, one is a Palace and one a primeval forest. The properties include 26 buildings designated by the Japanese Government as National Treasures as well as 53 designated as Important Cultural Properties. All compounds have been recognized as Historic Sites. The Nara Palace Site was designated as Special Historic Site and the Kasugayama Primeval Forest as Special Natural Monument. Tōdai-ji, Kōfuku-ji and the Kasugayama Primeval Forest overlap with Nara Park, a park designated as one of the "Places of Scenic Beauty" by the Ministry of Education, Culture, Sports, Science and Technology (MEXT). UNESCO listed the site as World Heritage in 1998.

== List of sites ==
The table lists information about each of the 8 listed properties of the World Heritage Site listing for the Historic Monuments of Ancient Nara:

Name: in English and Japanese
Type: Purpose of the site. The list includes five Buddhist temples ("-ji"), one Shinto shrine ("-jinja"), one palace and one primeval forest.
Period: time period of significance, typically of construction
Location: the site's location (by ward) and by geographic coordinates
Description: brief description of the site

Name	Image	Type	Period	Location	Description
Tōdai-ji (東大寺, Tōdai-ji; Eastern Great Temple)	Daibutsuden (大仏殿)	Buddhist temple	8th century - Nara period	34°41′21″N 135°50′23″E	A Buddhist temple complex that was once one of the powerful Seven Great Temples, Tōdai-ji's Daibutsuden (大仏殿, Great Buddha Hall) houses the world's largest bronze statue of the Buddha, Vairocana, known in Japanese as Daibutsu (大仏). The current Daibutsuden was built in 1709, and was the world's largest wooden building until 1998.
Kōfuku-ji (興福寺, Kōfuku-ji)	Kōfuku-ji (興福寺)	Buddhist temple	7th century - Asuka period	34°40′59.7″N 135°49′52.2″E	Once one of the powerful Seven Great Temples, Kōfuku-ji is the national headquarters of the Hossō school. It was originally established in 669 in what is present-day Kyoto, moved in 672 to the new capital of Fujiwara-kyō, before being dismantled and moved to its present location, on the east side of the newly constructed capital of Heijō-kyō (today's Nara).
Kasuga Grand Shrine (春日大社, Kasuga-taisha)	Kasuga-taisha (春日大社)	Shinto shrine	8th century - Nara period	34°40′53″N 135°50′54″E	Originally established in 768. Kasuga-taisha is the shrine of the Fujiwara clan, which dominated the Japanese politics of Heian period (794–1185). The interior is famous for its many bronze lanterns, as well as the many stone lanterns that lead up the shrine. From 1871 through 1946, Kasuga Shrine was officially designated one of the Kanpei-taisha (官幣大社), meaning that it stood in the first rank of government supported shrines.
Gangō-ji (元興寺)	Gangō-ji Gokurakubō (元興寺極楽坊)	Buddhist temple	6th century - Kofun period	34°40′41″N 135°49′52″E	Originally founded in 593 in nearby Asuka, the temple was moved to Nara in 718, following the capital's relocation to Heijō-kyō.
Yakushi-ji (薬師寺)	Yakushi-ji (薬師寺)	Buddhist temple	7th century - Asuka period	34°40′6.08″N 135°47′3.52″E	The original Yakushi-ji was built in Fujiwara-kyō, Japan's capital in the Asuka period, commissioned by Emperor Tenmu in 680 to pray for recovery from illness for his consort, who succeeded him as Empress Jitō. It was disassembled and moved to Nara eight years after the Imperial Court settled in what was then the new capital.
Tōshōdai-ji (唐招提寺)	Tōshōdai-ji (唐招提寺)	Buddhist temple	8th century - Nara period	34°40′32.11″N 135°47′5.40″E	Originally founded in 759 by the Tang dynasty Chinese monk Jianzhen, Tōshōdai-ji is a temple of the Risshū sect of Buddhism. Its kon-dō (Golden Hall) has a single story, hipped tiled roof with a seven-bay-wide facade, and is considered the archetype of "classical style."
Heijō Palace (平城宮, Heijō-kyū) - Nara Palace Site	The reconstructed Great Hall of State	Imperial residence	8th century - Nara period	34°41′28″N 135°47′44″E	The imperial residence and the administrative centre in the Japanese capital city Heijō-kyō (today's Nara) for most of the Nara period (710 to 794 AD), Heijō Palace was abandoned after the capital moved to Kyoto in 794. Nothing was left by the 12th century, but archaeological excavations and reconstructions since 1959 have restored much of the site.
Kasugayama Primeval Forest (春日山原始林, Kasugayamagenshirin)	Kasugayama Primeval Forest	primeval forest	8th century - Nara period	34°40′53.1″N 135°52′20.2″E	A primeval forest of about 250 hectares (620 acres) near the summit of Kasuga-yama (Mount Kasuga), Kasugayama Primeval Forest contains 175 kinds of trees, 60 bird types, and 1,180 species of insects. In this area adjacent to Kasuga Grand Shrine, hunting and logging have been prohibited since 841.

== See also ==
- List of World Heritage Sites in Japan
- Tourism in Japan
