= Gangōji Garan Engi =

Japanese Buddhist text

Gangōji Garan Engi Narabi ni Ruki Shizaichō (元興寺伽藍縁起并流記資財帳, "Origins of the Gangōji Monastery and Its Assets"), often abbreviated to Gangōji Garan Engi, is a Japanese Buddhist text. It is one volume in length and was compiled by an unnamed Buddhist monk in 747.

== Contents ==
The text is made up of four major sections. The first relates the early history of Japanese Buddhism. It states that in 538 King Seong of Baekje introduced Buddhism to Japan. It tells of a struggle between pro-Buddhist Soga no Iname and an anti-Buddhist faction. This is followed by the construction of several temples, including Gangō-ji from which the text takes its title.

The second and third sections reproduce the Asuka period stone inscriptions found on the tower finial as well as those found on a Buddhist statue.

The final section is a list of the temple assets. This includes population, rice paddies, and wells.

== Importance ==
The text is a primary source for early Buddhist history in Japan. Particularly well known is that the date given for the introduction of Buddhism from Baekje, 538, differs from that given in the Nihon Shoki, 552. In addition, the reproduction of the stone inscriptions are considered valuable resource for the study of Old Japanese.
