= Yakushi-ji =

Japanese Buddhist temple

Coordinates: 34°40′6.08″N 135°47′3.52″E

Yakushi-ji 薬師寺
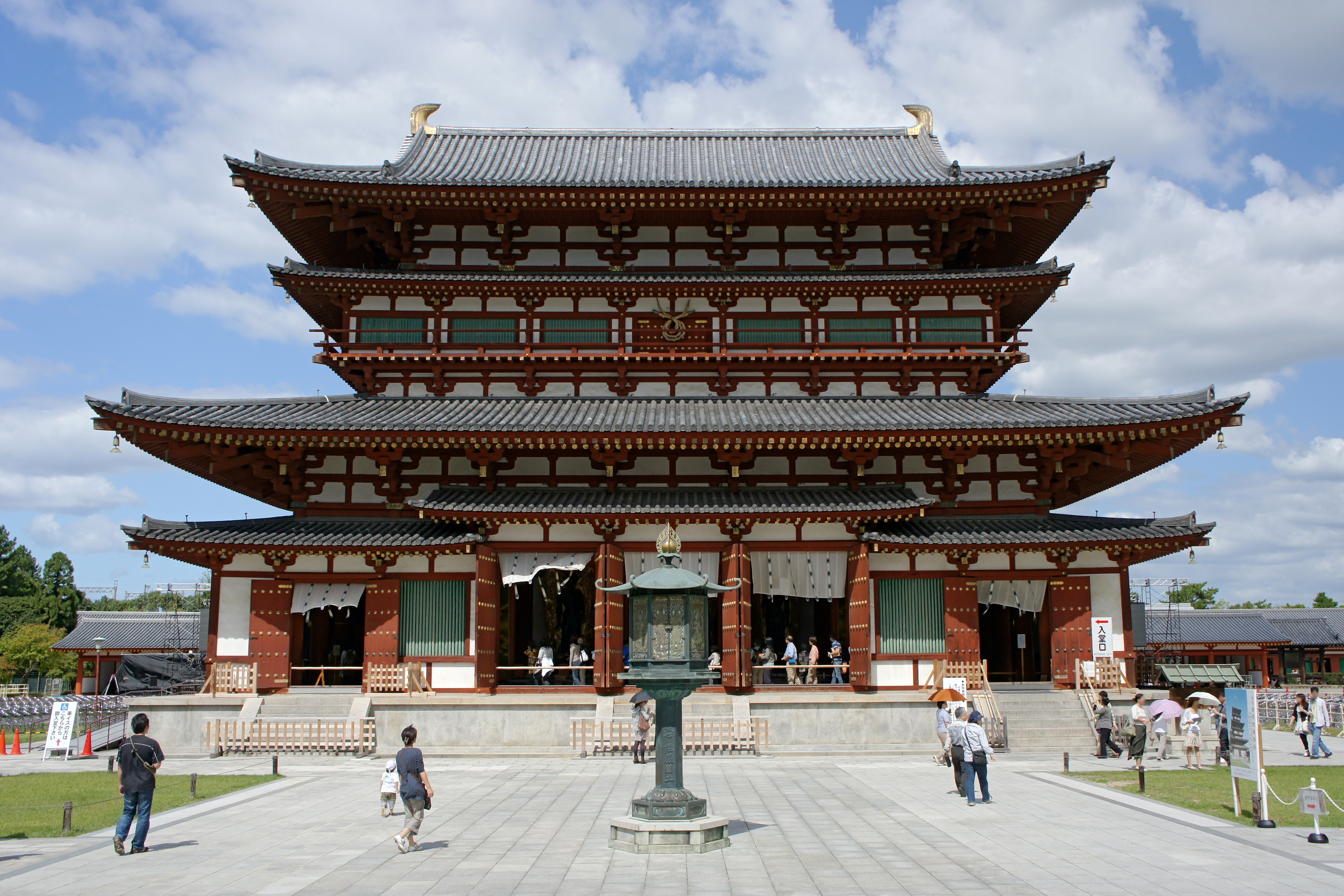
- The Golden Hall (kondō) at Yakushi-ji

Religion
- Affiliation: Hossō
- Deity: Yakushi Nyorai (Bhaiṣajyaguru)

Location
- Location: 457 Nishinokyō-chō, Nara, Nara Prefecture
- Country: Japan
- Interactive map of Yakushi-ji 薬師寺

Architecture
- Founder: Emperor Temmu
- Established: 680
- Completed: 1995 (Reconstruction)

Website
- yakushiji.or.jp/en/

Yakushi-ji (薬師寺) is one of the most famous imperial and ancient Buddhist temples in Japan, and was once one of the Seven Great Temples of Nanto, located in Nara. Originally built in the 7th century in the old capital of Fujiwara-kyō, the temple as it stands (built in 730) is said to be a scrupulous copy of the original. The temple is the headquarters of the Hossō school of Japanese Buddhism. Yakushi-ji is one of the sites that are collectively inscribed as a UNESCO World Heritage Site under the name of "Historic Monuments of Ancient Nara."

The temple's main object of veneration, Yakushi Nyorai, also known as "The Medicine Buddha", was one of the first Buddhist Deities to arrive in Japan from China in 680, and gives the temple its name.

== History ==
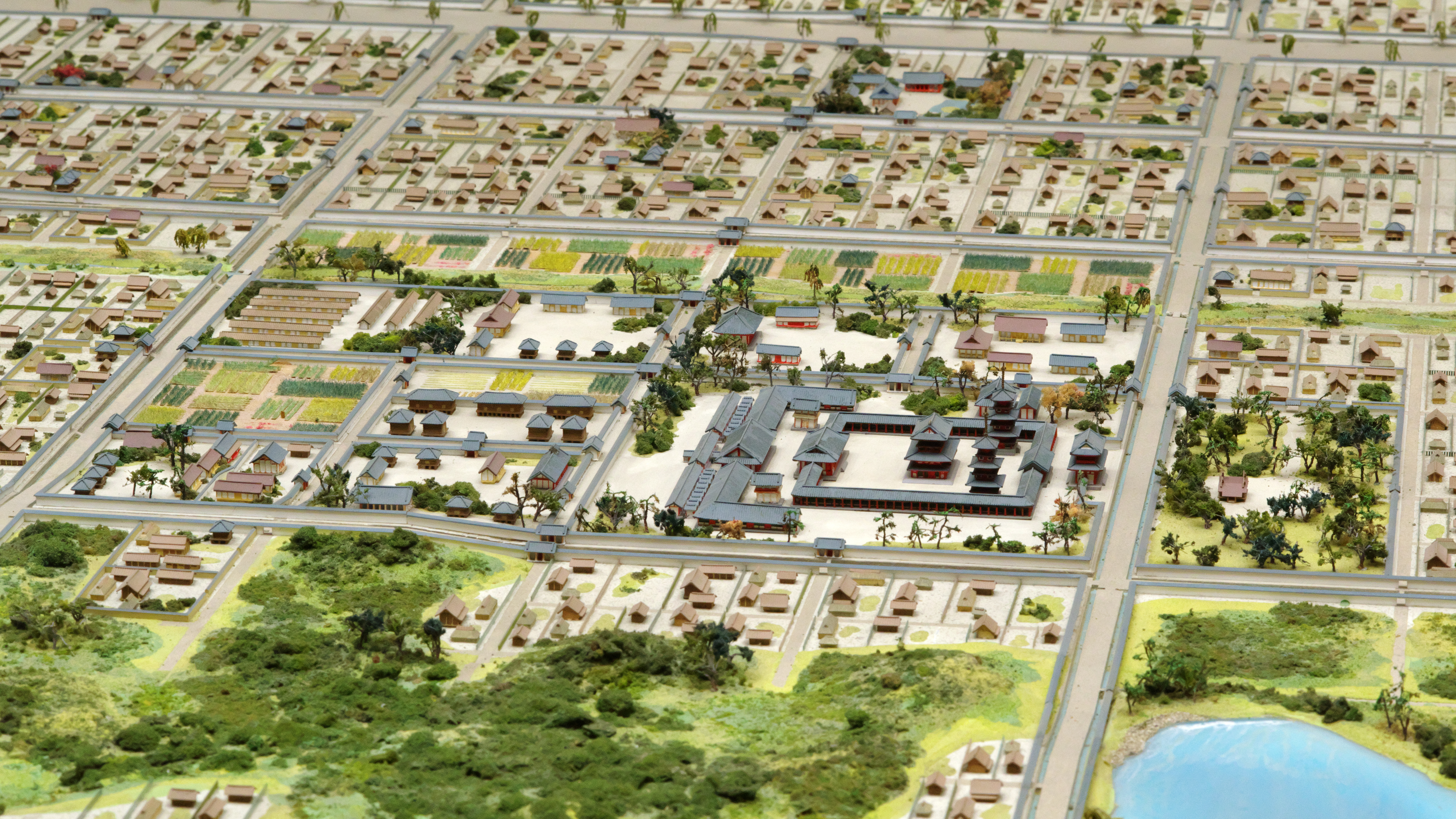
A model of the Yakushi-ji in the Nara period, a part of the Heijō-kyō 1/1000 model held by Nara City Hall. View from the west.

The Jinshin War in Japan in 672 resulted in moving the capital from Otsu back to Asuka. The movement of the capital was due to family disputes over money and power leading to civil war between Prince Naka and Prince Ōama. Prince Ōama desired power over Prince Naka's son, who was favored by his father to take the throne after him. After disagreements between Prince Ōama and Prince Naka's son, Prince Ōtomo, Prince Ōama secured victory over his brother and nephew. Prince Ōama, as Emperor Tenmu, was responsible for moving the temple from Otsu back to Asuka in 672. The original Yakushi-ji was built in Fujiwara-kyō, Japan's capital in the Asuka period. The Fujiwara capital was built during this time on the Chinese model, with hopes of improving economic stability and centralization of government, as well as a strong military.

Yakushi-ji was commissioned by Emperor Tenmu in 680 as an offering for the recovery from illness of his consort, who succeeded him as Empress Jitō. This act of building temples in devotion to Buddhist figures was a common practice among Japanese nobility after Buddhism was first imported from China and Korea. Emperor Tenmu had died by the time Empress Jitō completed the complex, in around 698. It was disassembled and moved to Nara eight years after the Imperial Court settled in what was then the new capital. The Nara Period (710–794) began with the transfer of the capital to Nara in 710 from the Fujiwara capital. This was due once again to the desire to build a strong, centralized government. Emperor Shōmu instigated the construction of the "Seven Great Temples": Tōdai-ji, Kōfuku-ji, Gangō-ji, Daian-ji, Yakushi-ji, Saidai-ji, and Hōryū-ji.

It has long been believed that the temple was moved to its present location in 718, following the move of the capital to Heijō-kyō, known today as Nara. However, excavation of the Fujiwara-kyō Yakushi-ji site in the 1990s suggested that there may have been two Yakushi-jis at one time. The Fujiwara-kyō Yakushi-ji is also referred to as Moto Yakushi-ji (元 moto, "original").

Fires destroyed most of the buildings in the complex in 973, and the main hall in 1528. The main hall was rebuilt in 1976, the west tower in 1981, the central gate in 1984, and both the east and west gates in 1995.

== East Pagoda ==
The East Pagoda (東塔, Tō-tō), completed in 730 during the Nara period, is the only original 8th-century structure at Yakushi-ji. The structure stands at 34 metres (112 ft), and is regarded as one of the finest pagodas in Japan, representing the architecture of the Hakuhō to Tenpyō periods. The East Pagoda has just three stories, but seems to have six because of the presence of inter-story pent roofs (mokoshi). The structure is topped by a distinctive globe-shaped finial. The East Pagoda was disassembled for repair work from 1898 to 1900, and disassembled again in 2012. The central pillar of the pagoda (心柱, shinbashira) had corroded, and the edges of the eaves of the pagoda had sagged. A seven-story scaffold completely surrounded the East Tower as repair work continued to 2018.

== Architecture ==
=== Layout ===
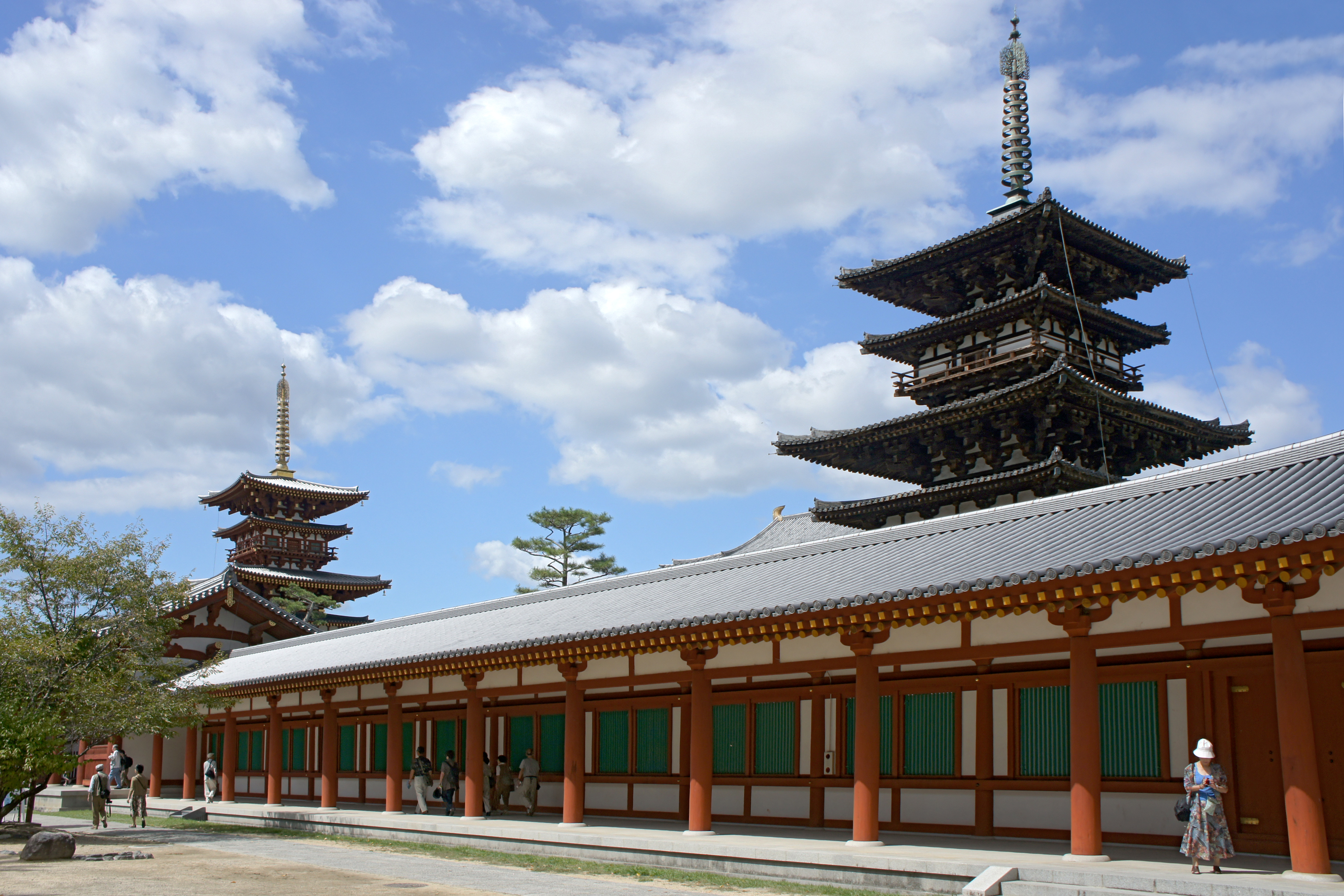
The two three-story pagodas, Tōtō and Saitō

Yakushi-ji's layout is symmetrical, with two main halls and two three-story pagodas. The unique layout is sometimes referred to as the "Yakushiji style". Yakushi-ji is geometrically planned as a grid to replicate the Fujiwara capital, and to embody the new location. The Golden Hall stands in the middle of Yakushi-ji. Forward to the east and west of the golden hall are two pagodas symmetrically placed in order to bring attention to the Hall. The Golden Hall in Fujiwara resembles the Golden Hall at Heijo. Eighteen column foundation stones found at Fujiwara show that the distance between each column is exactly the same as the distance between each column at Heijo. There are also identical staircases on each side of both temples.

Discoveries of an underlying road system at Yakushi-ji at Fujiwara demonstrates that the temple was constructed around the road systems in the new capital. The East Pagoda replicated styles at the Heijo Yakushi-ji, with 12 granite column foundation stones found during excavations, while the West Pagoda demonstrated signs of being constructed during the early Nara period, after the capital had been moved, and has a different style. There are few remnants of the Fujiwara Yakushi-ji today: the only visible markings are the foundations and columns of the Golden Hall.

=== Yakushi Triad ===
Yakushi was first worshipped as a "Medicine Buddha" by members of the wealthy and powerful elite, who prayed to him for relief from illness for themselves or their loved ones. It was not until later that the Tendai sect developed a cult around him on the basis that he could bring health and prosperity to all human beings. Yakushi is still included among the 14 deities venerated at memorial services.

Sculptures of Yakushi before the 7th century are made from bronze, but sculptures made later are made from wood. Among 247 statues known, 224 are wood, 17 bronze, four stone, and two iron. Other differences between old and new Yakushi sculptures include the fact that in the older sculptures Yakushi does not hold a medicine jar in his hand. The Yakushi Triad at Yakushi-ji is known for being one of the most well-known icons in Japan as well as one of the earliest example of T’ang style used in Japan. The Nara Period is evident in the Yakushi Triad due to the idea that they are wooden sculptures, which was used among sculptors in this time period. It is up for debate for scholars as to where the Yakushi Triad originated. There are arguments among scholars who believe it was made to be an icon at Fujiwara-kyō Yakushi-ji, while others argue that it was made in the early Nara Period for the Heijō-kyō Yakushi-ji.

== Images ==
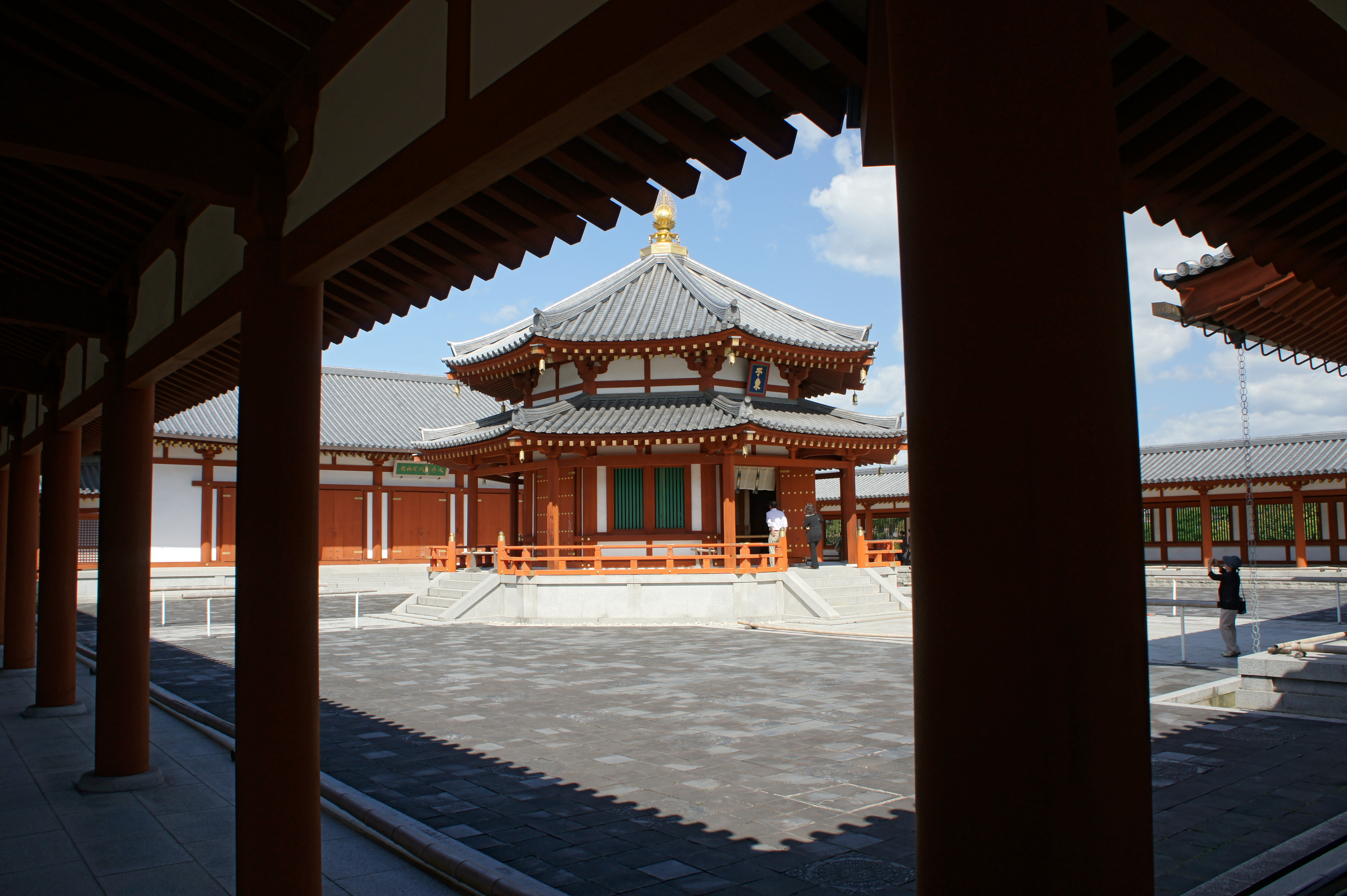
Genjō-sanzōin (Xuanzang Hall)

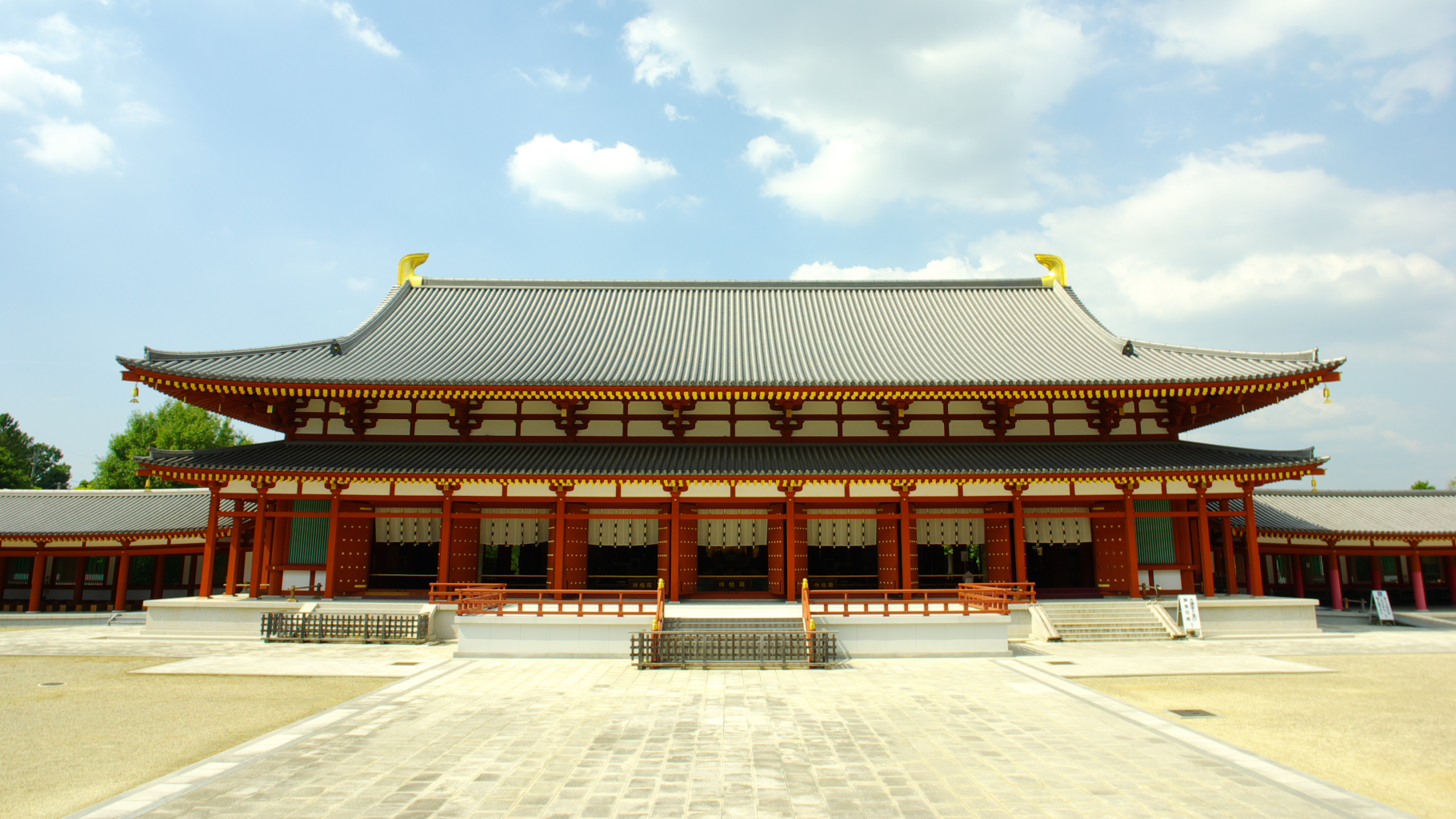
Daikodō (Lecture Hall)

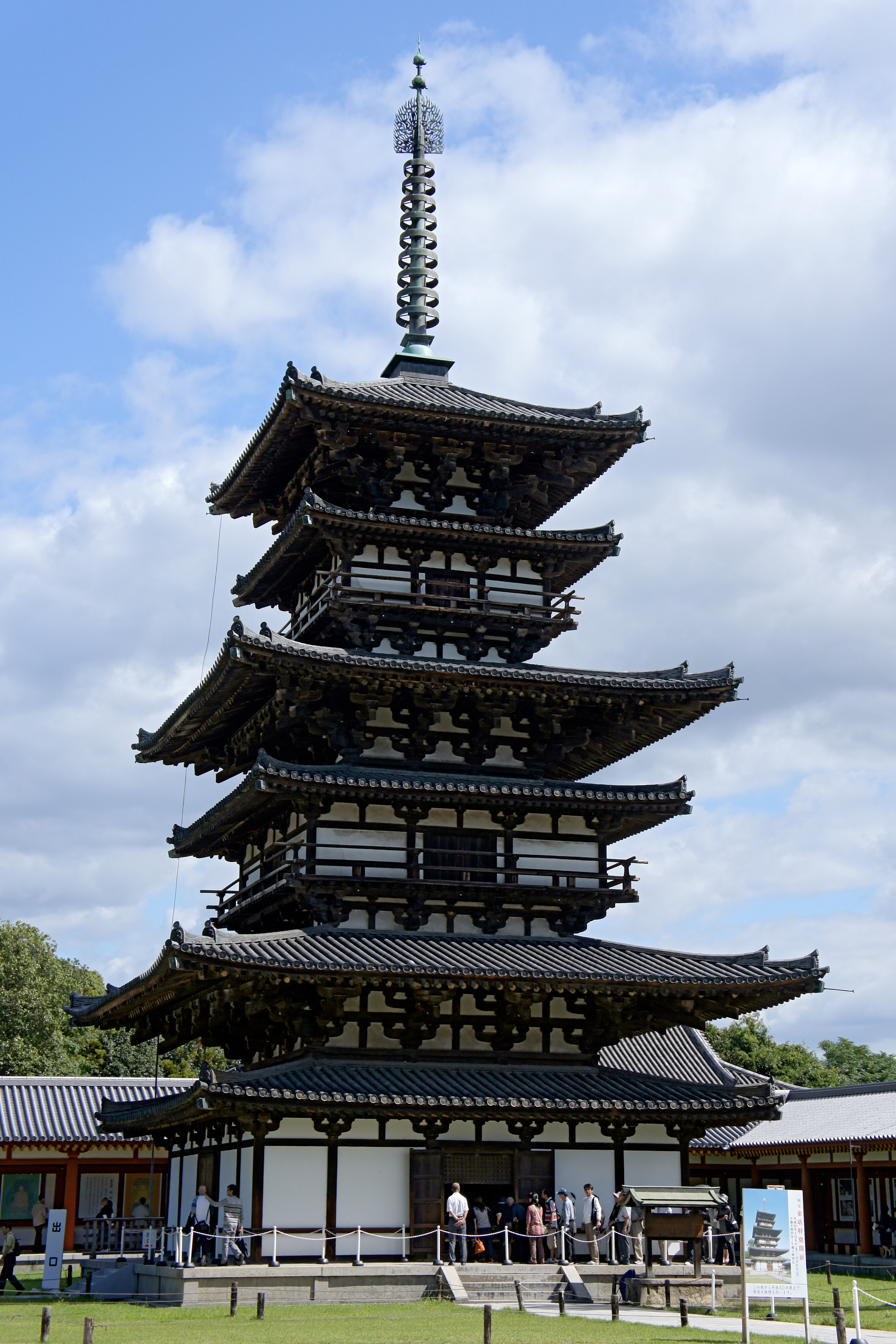
Tōtō (East Pagoda)

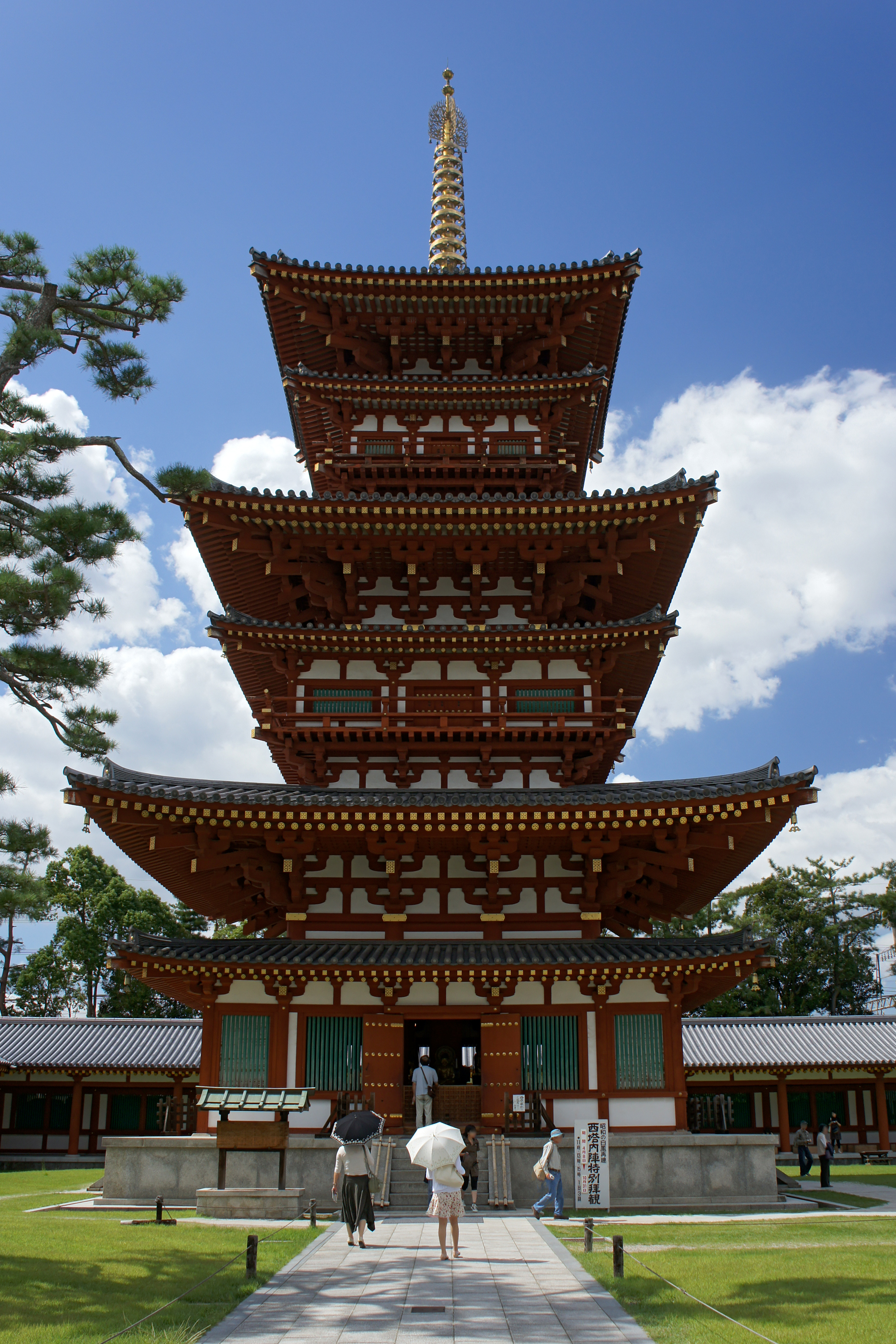
Saitō (West Pagoda)

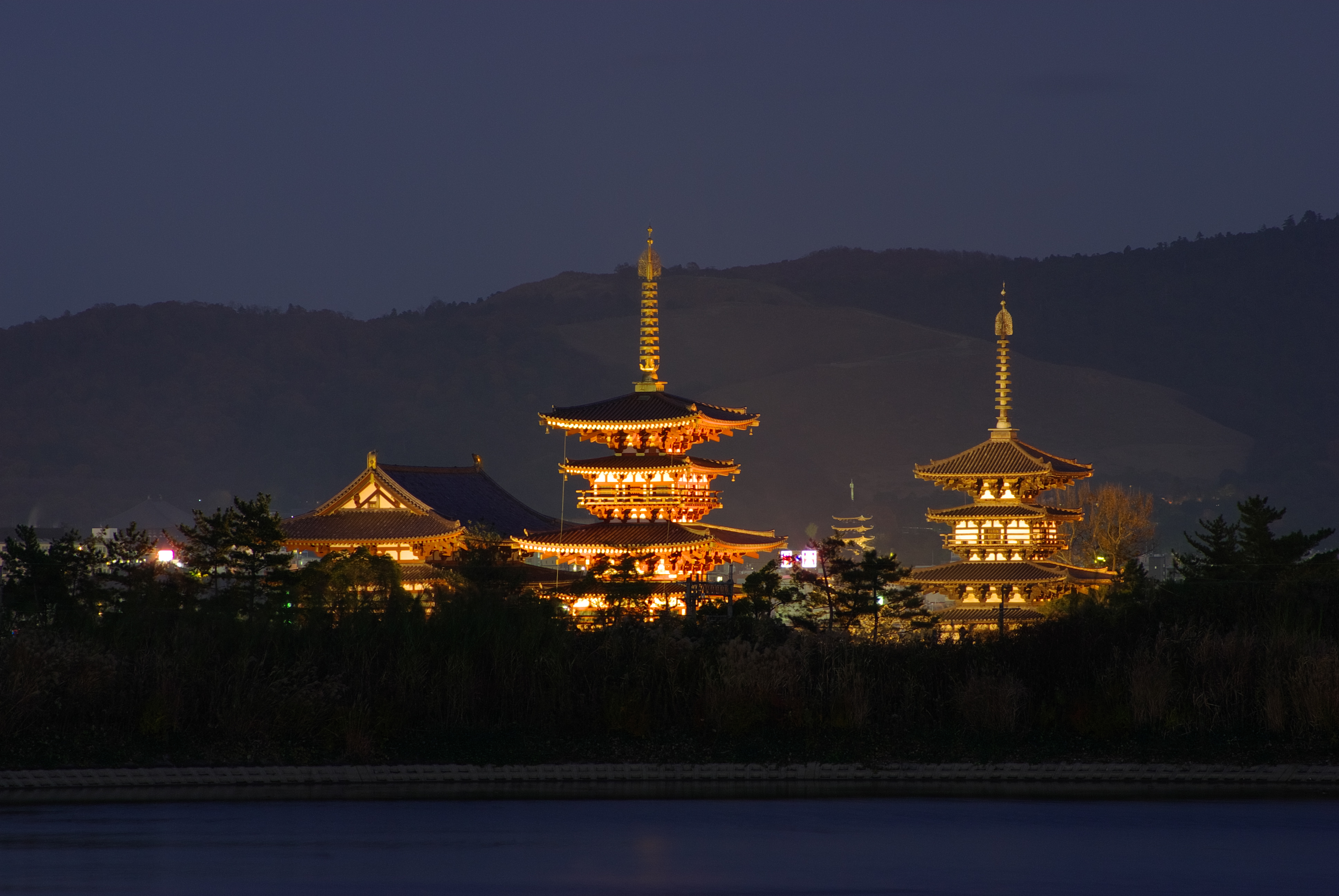
Nighttime view

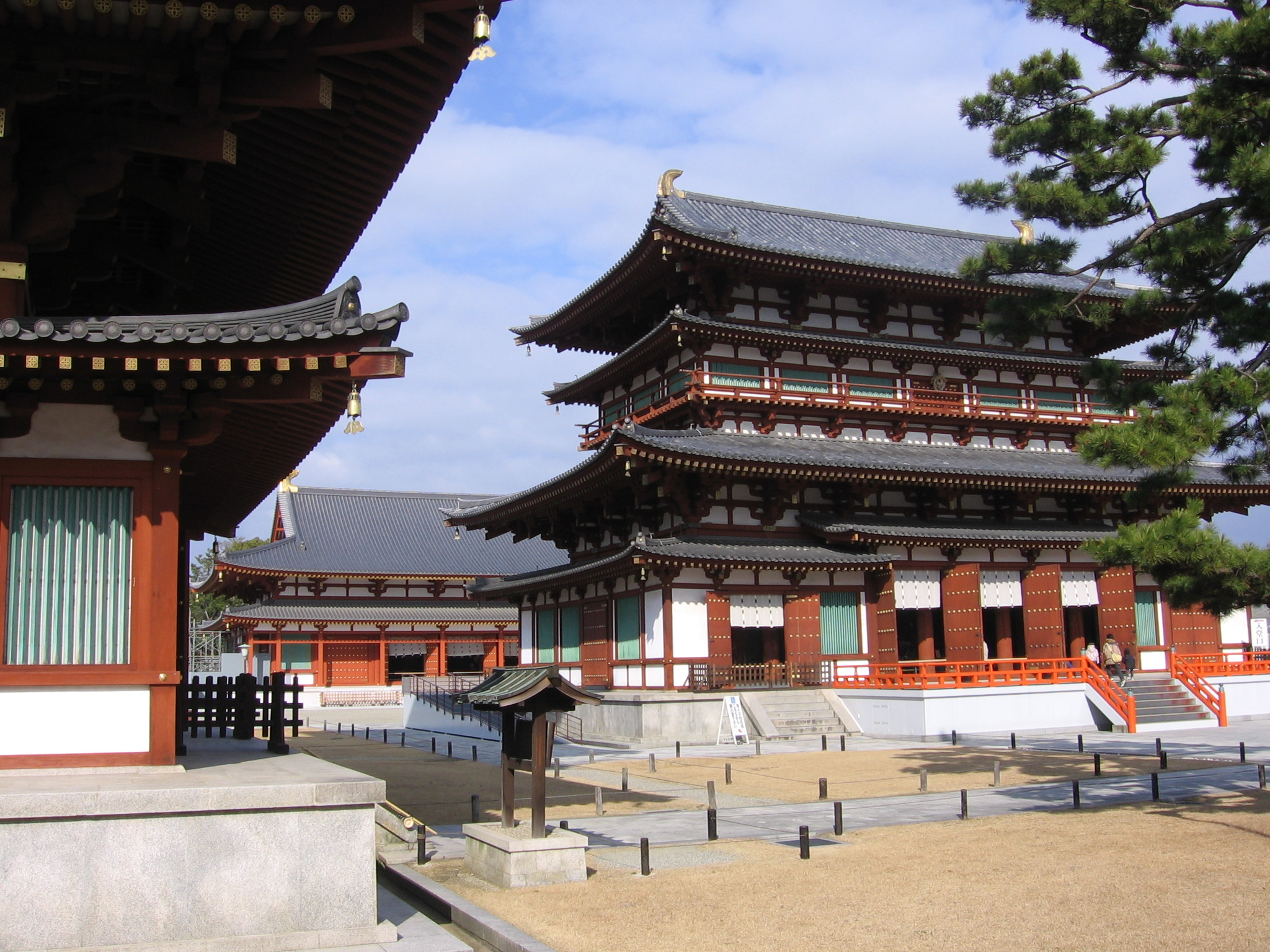
Courtyard

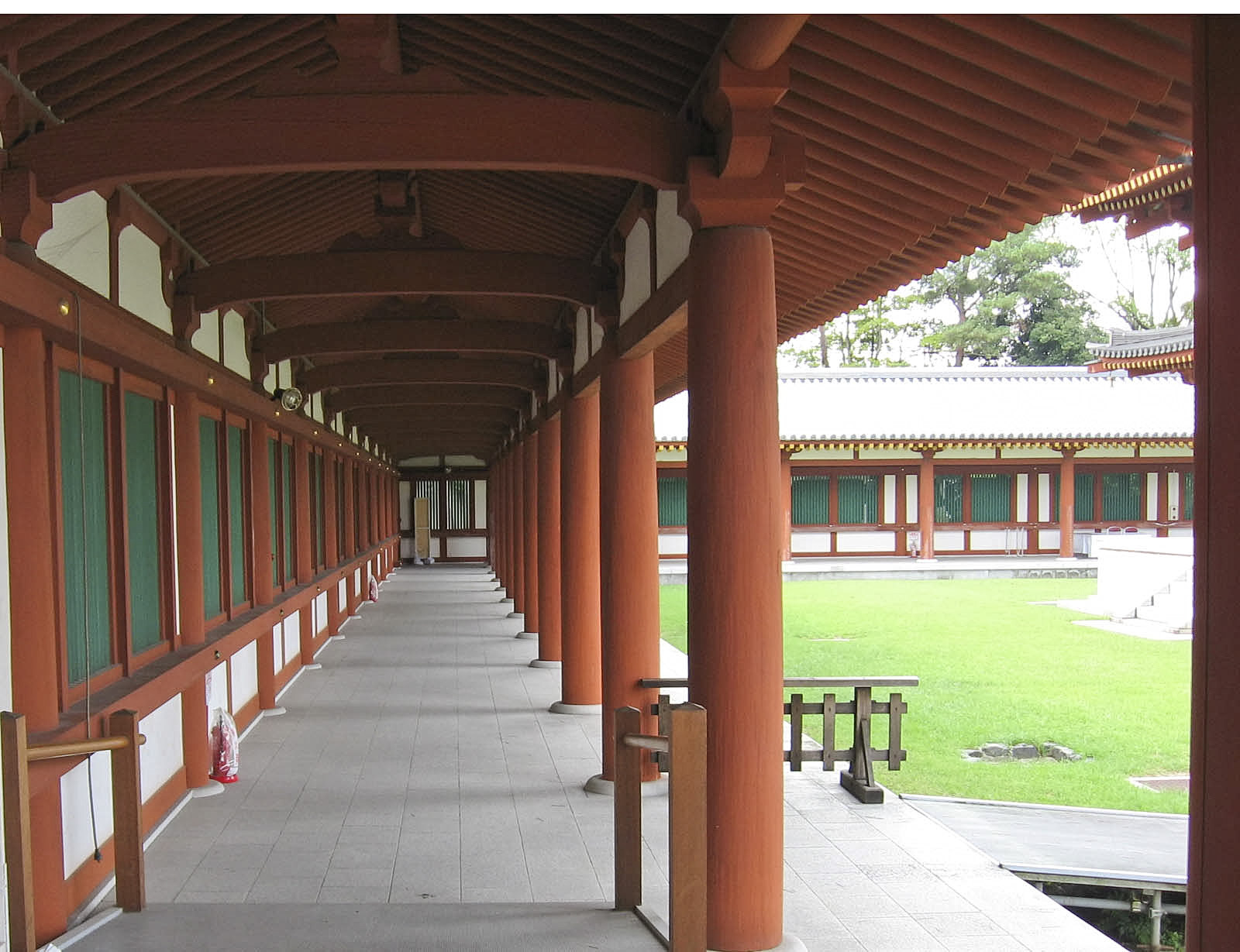
Cloister

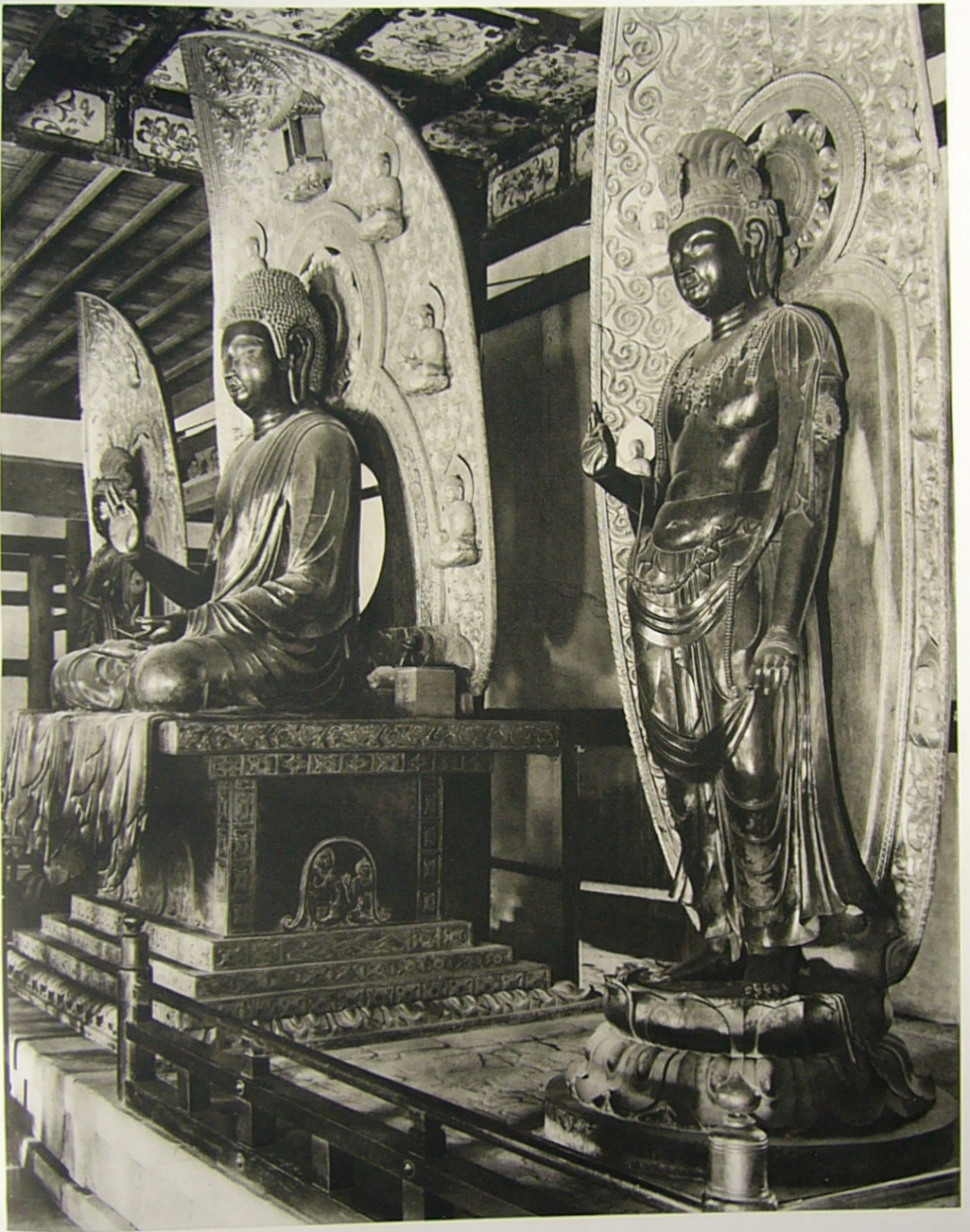
Yakushi Sanzon (Medicine Buddha Trinity)

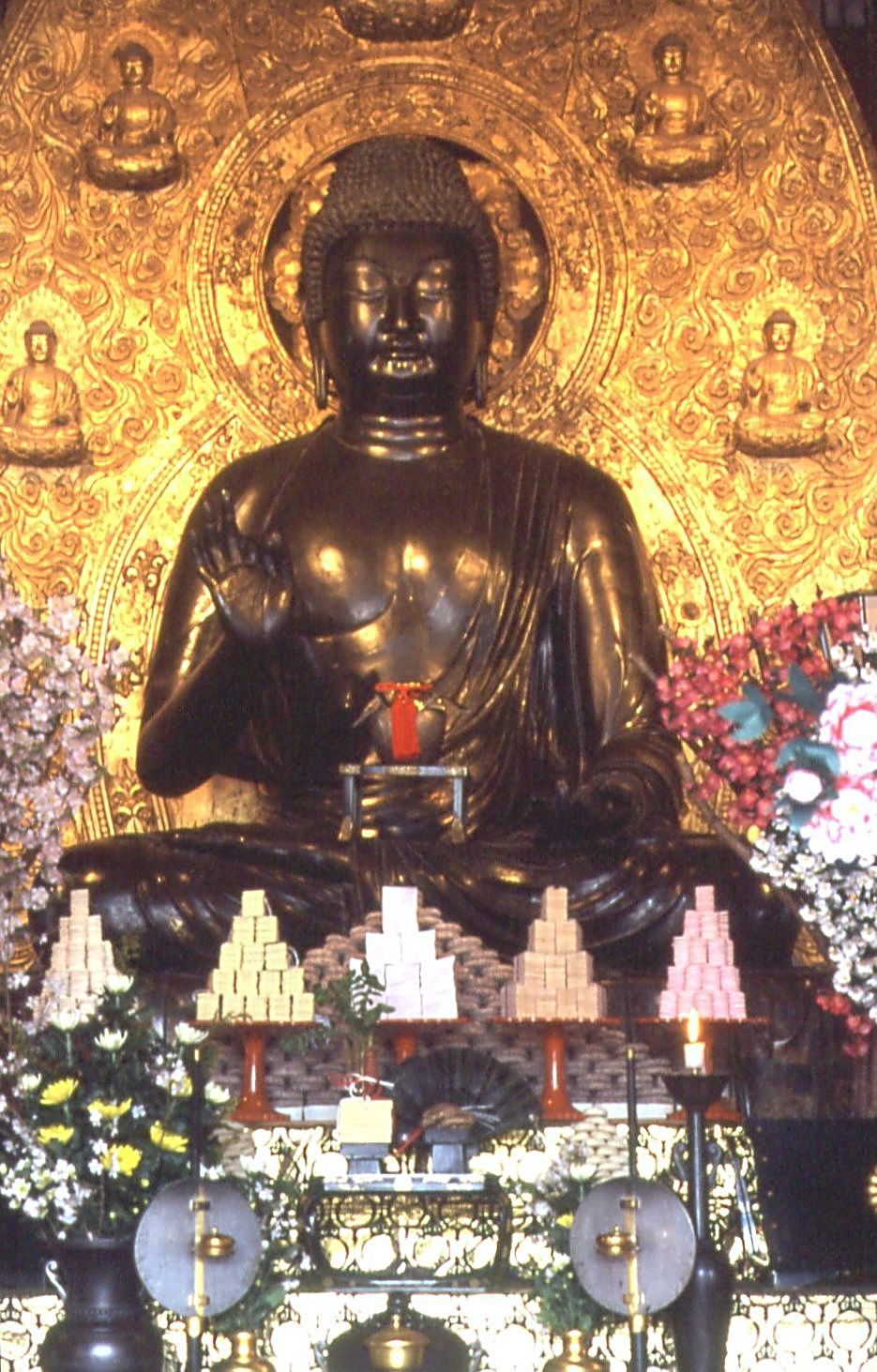
Yakushi Nyorai (Medicine Buddha)

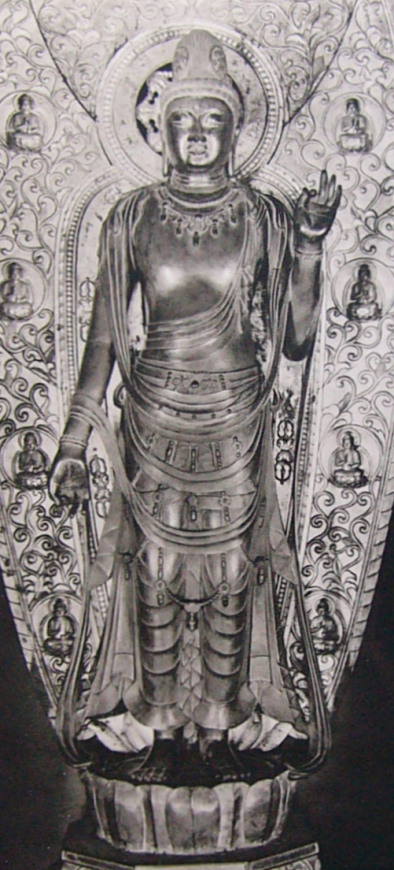
Sho-Kannon Bosatsu (Avalokitesvara)

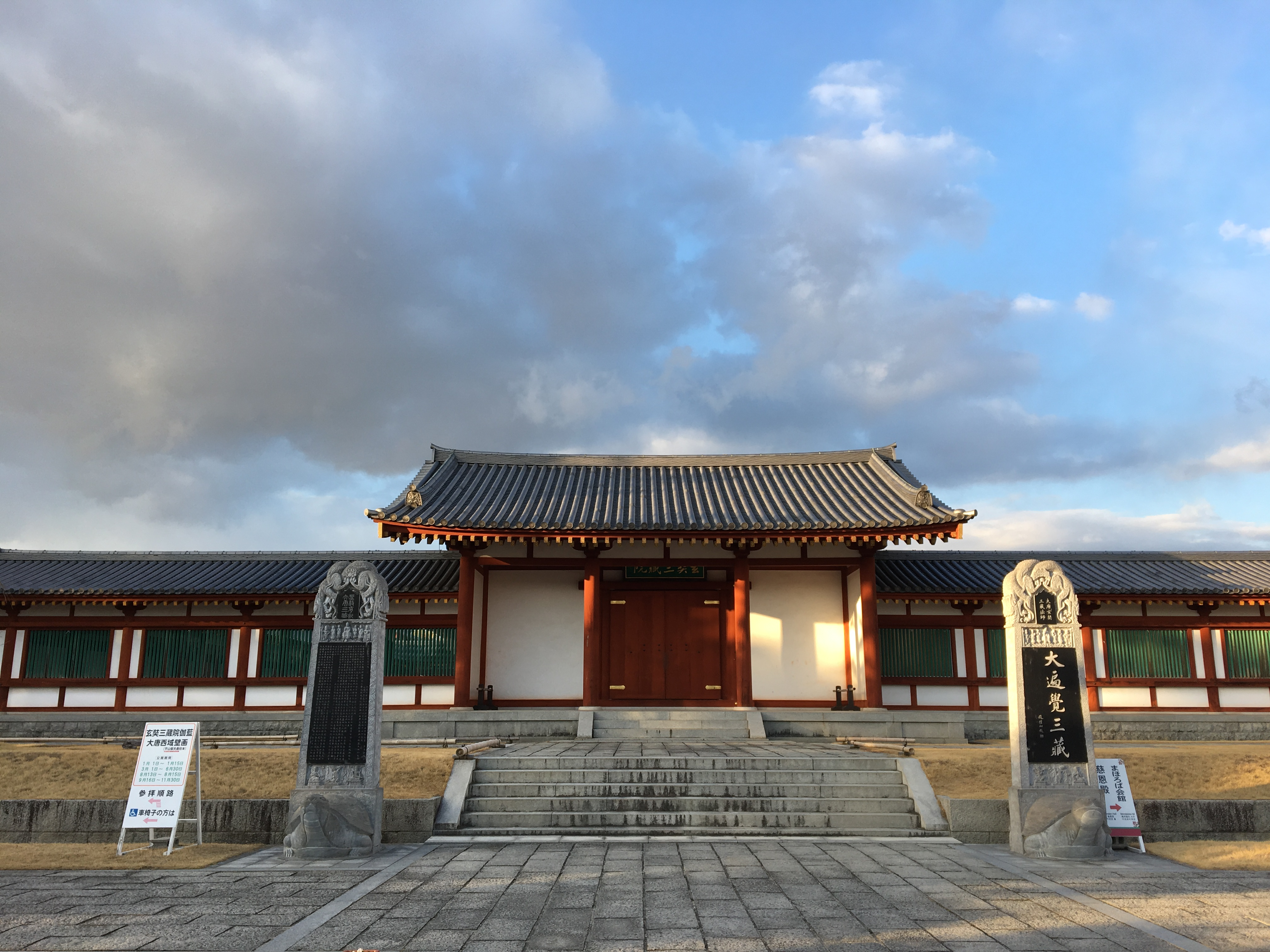
Genjou-sanzou-in

== See also ==
- Bussokuseki-kahi
- List of National Treasures of Japan (archaeological materials)
- List of National Treasures of Japan (paintings)
- List of National Treasures of Japan (sculptures)
- List of National Treasures of Japan (temples)
- Nanto Shichi Daiji, Seven Great Temples of Nanto
- Shinbashira, the central, usually suspended wooden column inside
