= Gangō-ji =

Buddhist temple in Nara, Japan

- 元興寺
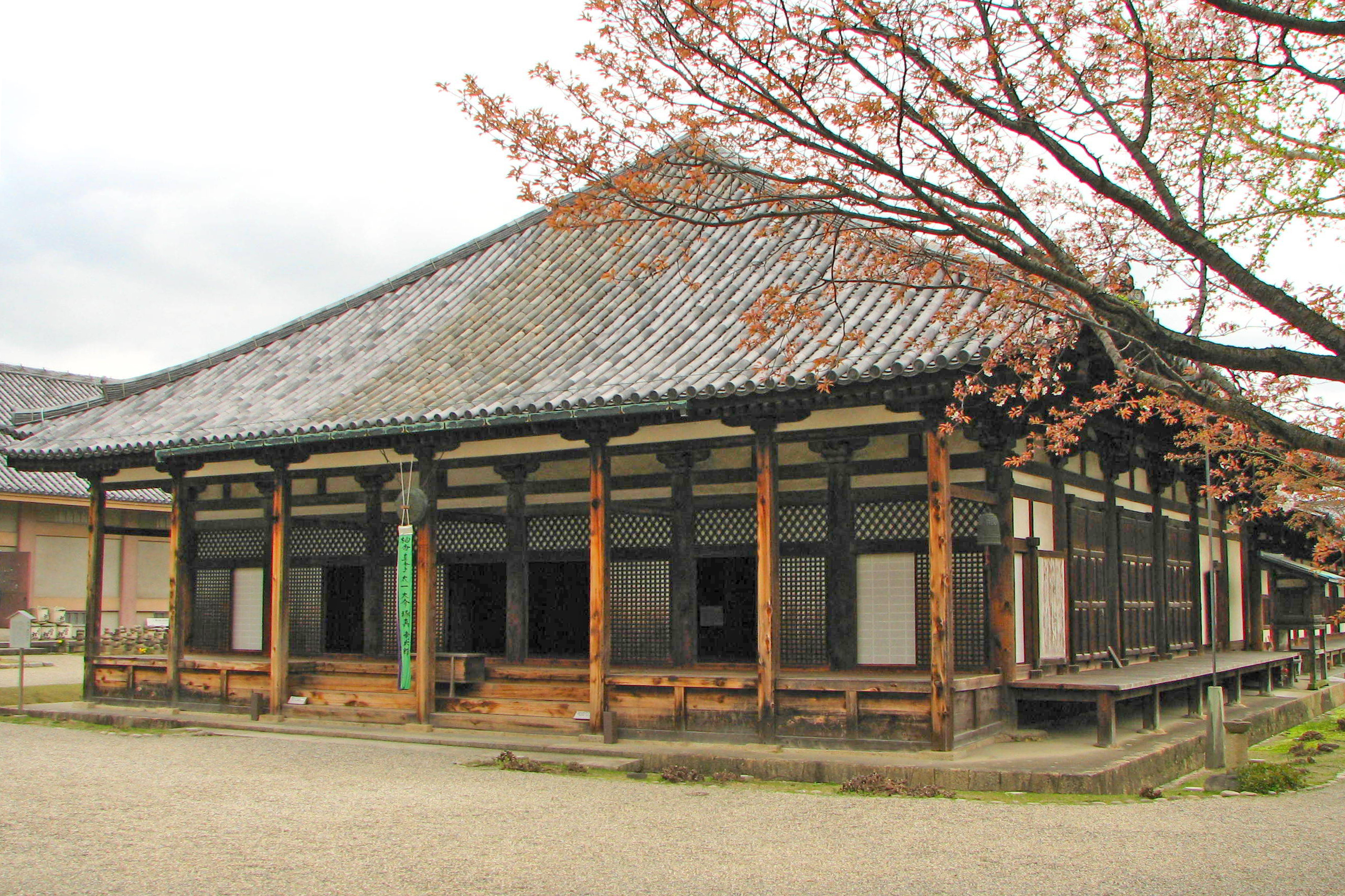
- Gokurakubō (National Treasure)

- Location within Nara Prefecture Location within Japan

Religion
- Affiliation: Buddhist
- Deity: Miroku Bosatsu
- Rite: Sanron and Hosso

Location
- Location: 11 Chūin-chō, Nara-shi, Nara-ken (Gokuraku-bo)
- Country: Japan
- Coordinates: 34°40′40.09″N 135°49′52.88″E

Architecture
- Founder: Empress Suiko and Soga no Umako
- Completed: 593
- UNESCO World Heritage Site
- Type: Cultural
- Criteria: (ii), (iii), (iv), (vi)
- Designated: 1998
- Reference no.: 870
- National Treasure of Japan
- National Historic Site of Japan

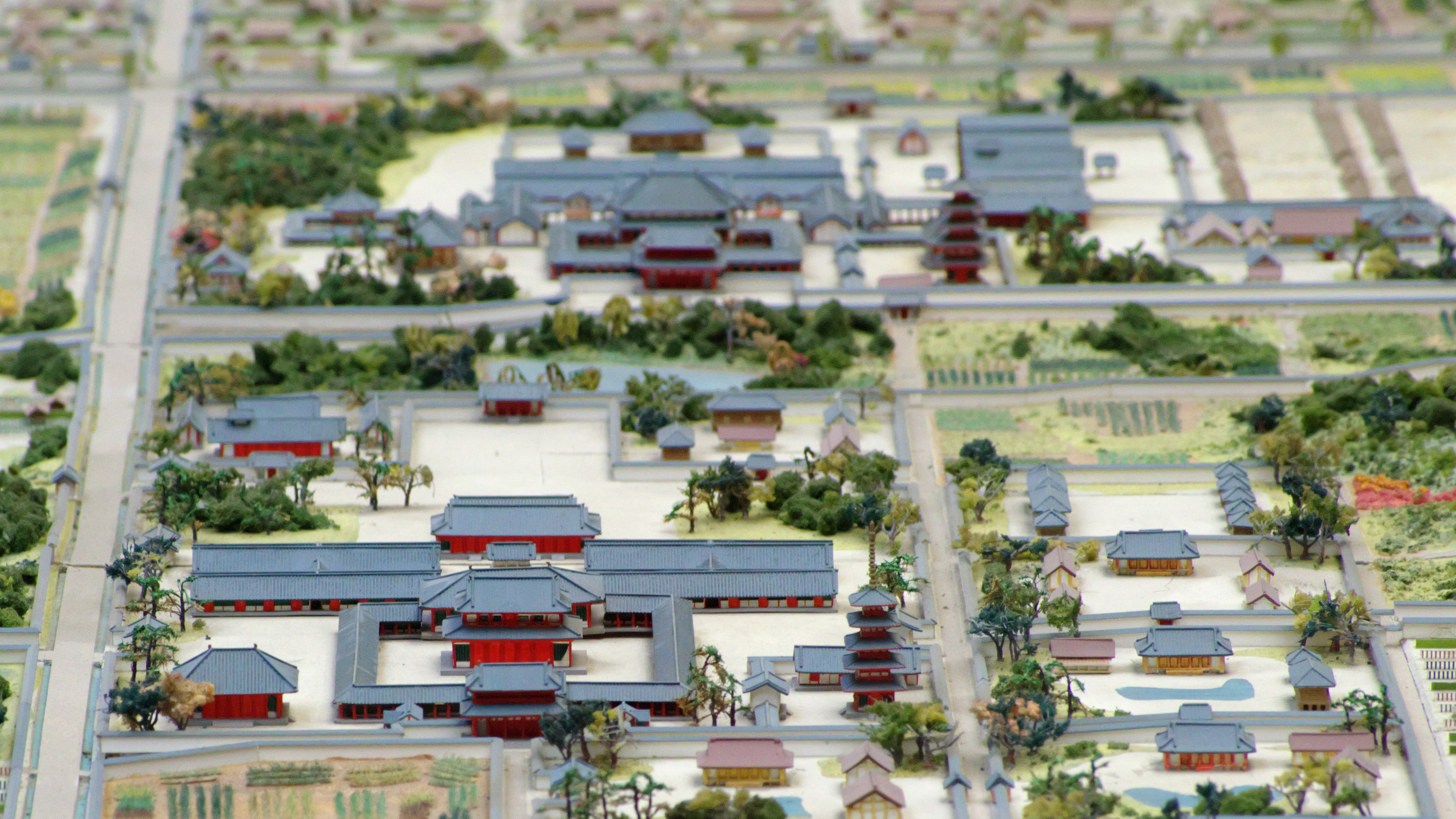
Model of Gangō-ji in the Nara period; the temple at the top of the photo is Kofuku-ji

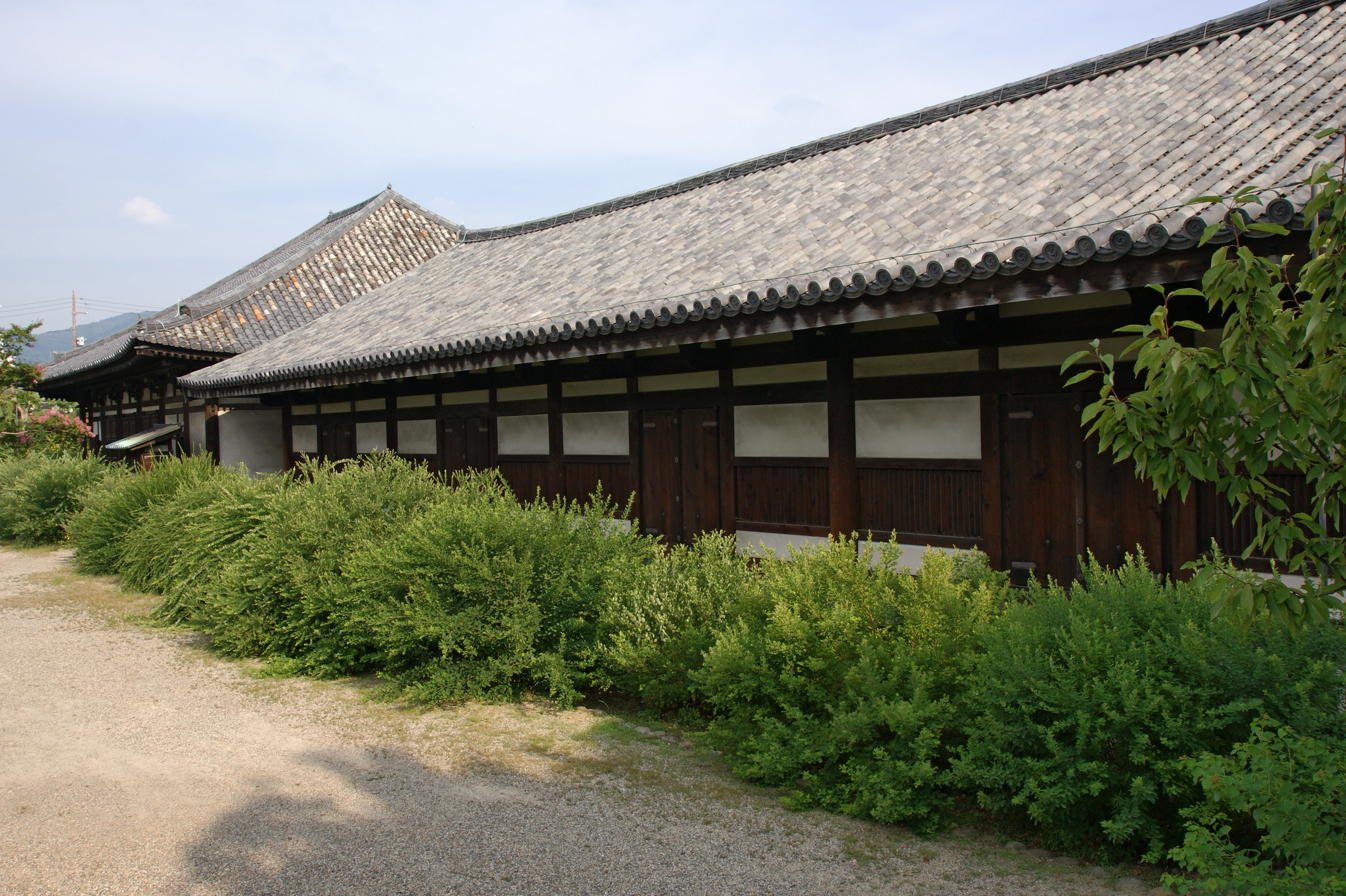
Gangō-ji Gokurakubo zenshitsu (National Treasure)

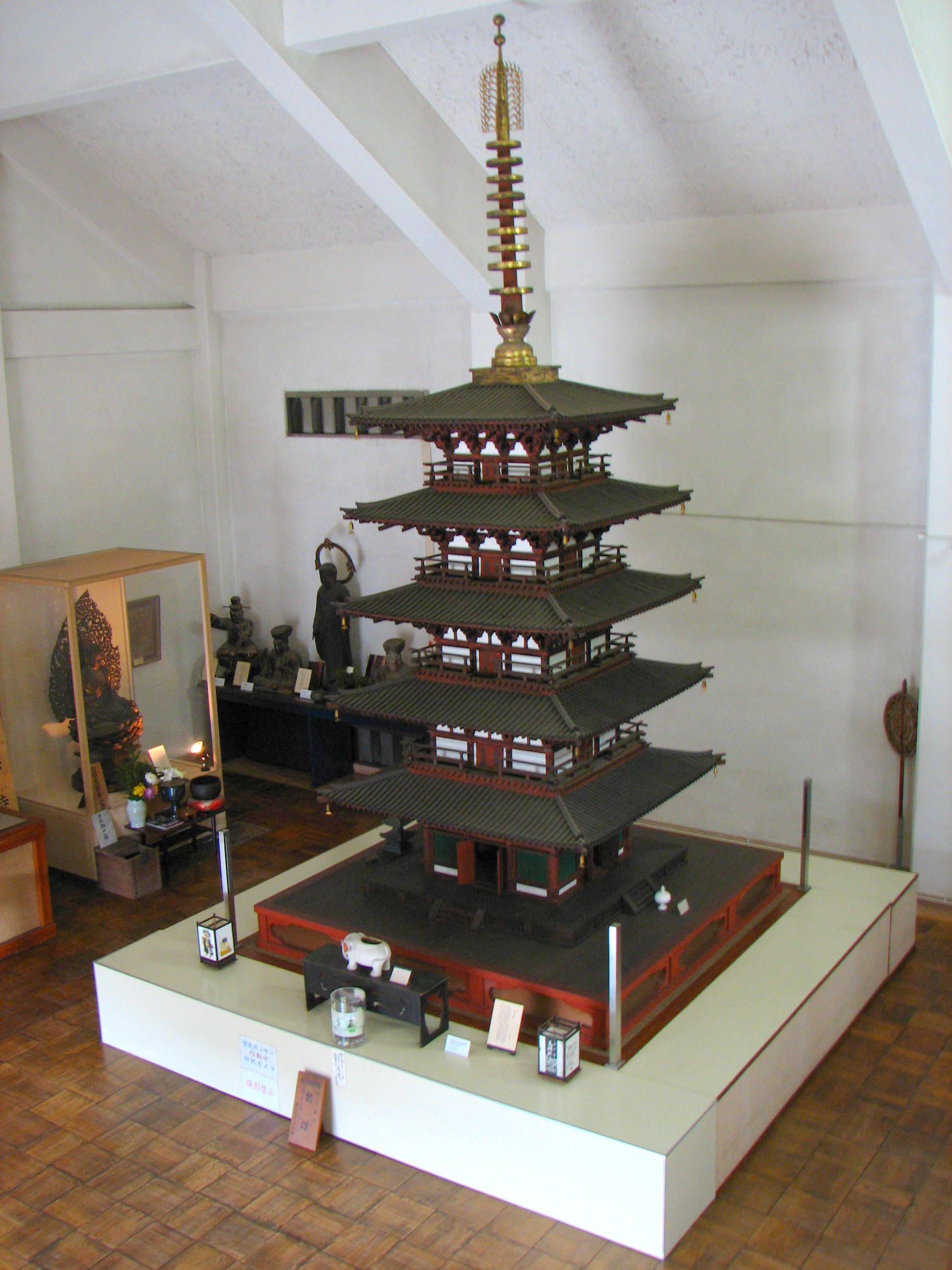
Gangō-ji miniature pagoda (National Treasure)

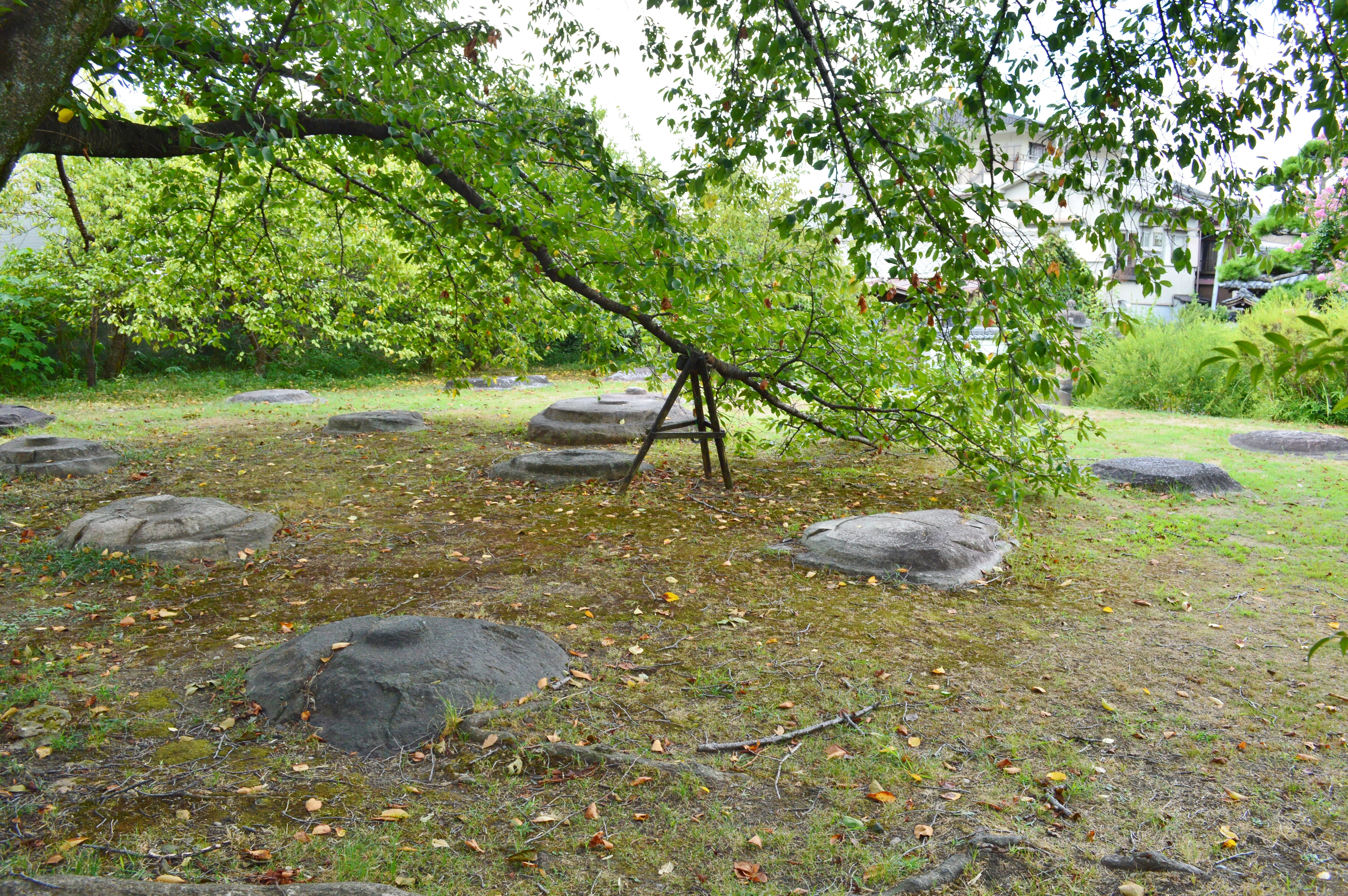
Site of the Five-story Pagoda

Gangō-ji (元興寺) was one of the first Buddhist temples in Japan, and was ranked as one of the powerful Seven Great Temples, in Nara, Japan. It was mostly destroyed in the Muromachi period and the old town of Naramachi occupies most of what was once the temple's precincts. Three small portions of the temple have survived to the present day, and each is now a separate temple.

== History ==
With the relocation of the capital to Heijō-kyō in 710, the temples of Yakushi-ji, Umayasaka-ji (later Kofuku-ji), Daikandai-ji (later Daian-ji), and other temples in Asuka were moved to the new capital. Hōkō-ji (Asuka-dera) was also moved to Heijō-kyō in 718, but the original Hōkō-ji in Asuka was not abolished and remained in its original location. The temple in Asuka retained the name "Hōkō-ji" or "Hon-Gankō-ji," while the temple in Heijō-kyō was named "Gangō-ji (or Shin-Gankō-ji)."

During the Nara period, Gangō-ji was a major establishment, similar in size to Tōdai-ji, and was the main seminary for both the Sanron and the Hosso sects. The temple complex was a complete Shichidō garan with a Great South Gate, Central Gate, Main Hall, Lecture Hall, Bell tower, and Dining Hall, all lined up in a straight line from north to south. A corridor stretched from the left and right sides of the Central Gate, surrounding the Main Hall and reaching the left and right sides of the Lecture Hall. Outside the corridor, to the east was the Eastern Pagoda Compound, which was centered around a five-story pagoda, and to the west was the Small Pagoda Compound. In addition, there were several buildings where monks lived on each side behind the Lecture Hall. These were long tenement-like buildings running east to west, and the monks' quarters on the east side were remodeled during the Kamakura period to become the new Main Hall and Zen room of Gokurakubō.

The temple grounds were long and narrow, stretching from north to south for four chō (approximately 440 meters) and east to west for 2 chō (approximately 220 meters). The area south of Sarusawa-ike Pond, south of Kofuku-ji, and today commonly known as "Naramachi" (Nara Town), was originally the grounds of Gangō-ji.

After the capital was relocated to Heian-kyō, Gangō-ji gradually fell into decline. Newer Buddhist sects, such as Tendai and Shingon, had supplanted Sanron and Hosso, and with the collapse of the Ritsuryō system in the mid-Heian period (10th to 11th centuries), the temple lost control of the estates on which it depended for support. Historical records from this period, such as the "Dosha Sonshiki Kenrokucho" (Record of the Reconstruction of Temples and Buildings) from 1035, state that many of the buildings, including the main hall, were in ruins, and that the head priest of the temple had been reduced to selling the temple's treasures in order to maintain the temple. According to a record from 1246, the fourth and fifth stories of the five-story pagoda and its spire had been lost by this time, and the Great South Gate and bell tower had been severely damaged. In 1451, during the Muromachi period, a peasant uprising set the Small Pagoda Compound on fire, and the flames spread to the entire temple. The five-story pagoda survived, but other main buildings such as the Main Hall were destroyed. Although the Main Hall was rebuilt, it was destroyed again by a strong wind in 1472, and was never rebuilt again. After this, houses were built on the ruins, and by the end of the Muromachi period, the temple had split into three separate temples, each centered on one of the remaining components of the original temple.

== Gangō-ji Gokuraku-in (Gokurakubō) ==
The Gokuraku-in (Gokurakubō) (元興寺極楽坊) is the Shingon-Ritsu sect successor to Gangō-ji. It is centered on the Gokuraku-dō (Mandala-dō), which enshrines the Chiko Mandala as its honzon. The Chiko Mandara is a mandala depicting the Pure Land with Amida Nyorai in the center, drawn by the Nara period scholar-monk Chiko, which from the late Heian period began to attract worshippers with the popularity of the idea of the end of the world and the rise of the Amida Pure Land faith.

The hall in which the mandala was enshrined was called Gokuraku-in, and gradually developed into a sub-temple of Gangō-ji. It was remodeled in the Kamakura period from the monks' quarters where Chiko and other monks had lived during the Nara period. This building, along with the "Zen room" are now designated National Treasures and is collectively registered as a World Heritage Site as part of the “Historic Monuments of Ancient Nara“. The Gokuraku-in was renamed "Gangō-ji Gokurakubō" in 1955, and then "Gangō-ji" in 1977. The precincts of the Gokurakubō is one of the three parts of the ancient temple complex to be protected as a National Historic Site in 1965.

== Gangō-ji Pagoda Site ==
The Gangō-ji East Pagoda ruins (元興寺塔跡) are located in the Shiba Araya-chō neighborhood the "old town" area of Naramachi in the city of Nara. It also is one of the three parts of the ancient temple complex to be protected as a National Historic Site in 1932. The remains of the pagoda is now sandwiched between private houses. The pagoda's base is 17.7 meters on each side, 90-centimeters high, and surrounded by stone walls, with 17 foundation stones remaining. Based on the remaining foundation stones and sketches from the Edo period, the pagoda was a five-story pagoda with a side length of about 10 meters, a central length of 3.8 meters between the three pillars of the first floor, and 3.19 meters between both sides. Based on jewels, copper coins, altar implements unearthed around the central stone during an archaeological excavation in 1927, it is estimated that the pagoda was constructed in the late 8th century, about 50 years after the capital was moved to Heijō-kyō. It is about a 10-minute walk from Kintetsu Nara Station on the Kintetsu Nara Line.

The Eastern Pagoda Compound became a Kegon sect temple centered on the pagoda and a Kannon-do, which housed a famous statue of Kannon Bosatsu formerly housed in the Central Gate. The pagoda was destroyed by a fire in 1859, and the temple fell into disrepair and was abandoned in the early Meiji period. Artifacts excavated from the earthen platform of the Gangō-ji pagoda site and a standing statue of Yakushi Nyorai (National Treasure) have been entrusted to the Nara National Museum.

== Small Pagoda Complex ==
The Shōtō-in (小塔院) was the third of the successor temples to Gangō-ji and was also designated a National Historic Site in 1965. The Small Pagoda Compound was initially constructed by Empress Shōtoku within the intent that it would house one million small wooden votive pagodas to pray for the souls of those who died in the Fujiwara no Nakamaro Rebellion.

According to an article from 834 in the Shoku Nihon Kōki, it was located to the southwest of the main Gangō-ji temple complex, symmetrically positioned opposite the larger East Pagoda complex, and consisted of a small pagoda with a prayer hall to the south, three other buildings with a cypress bark roof, and a gate. It was from this location that the fire of October 1451 which destroyed the complete Gangō-ji complex originated.

The current structure is a Shingon-Ritsu chapel to Kokuzō Bosatsu built in 1707. A small wooden five-story pagoda from that time, about 5.5 meters high, is still in the possession of Gangō-ji Temple and is designated as a National Treasure as it conveys the architectural style of five-story pagodas from the Nara period. Within the temple grounds, is a hōkyōintō stone pagoda from the late Kamakura period, which is a memorial tower for Gomei, a priest who was active between the Nara and Heian periods. Gomei was a member of the Hata clan and perfected Hosso doctrine at Gangō-ji. He was appointed as a monk in 827 and died at Shoto-in in 834, so he is also known as Shōtō-in Sōmei.

=== In the Man'yōshū ===
The Man'yōshū includes a poem attributed to a monk of Gango-ji. This poet laments that, having attained enlightenment, his greater understanding remains unnoticed by others in the streets of Nara. His poem may perhaps bemoan his undervalued condition—and yet, in a modest way, his words transport contemporary readers momentarily back to share his quiet, 8th century perspective:

A White gem unknown of men –
Be it so if no one knows!
Since I myself know its worth
Although no other –
Be it so if no one knows!

– A monk of the Gango-ji Temple

== See also ==
- Asuka-dera
- Gangōji Garan Engi, a historical text of the temple
- List of National Treasures of Japan (sculptures)
- List of National Treasures of Japan (temples)
- Nanto Shichi Daiji, Seven Great Temples of Nanto.
- List of Historic Sites of Japan (Nara)
