= Nanto Shichi Daiji =

Buddhist temples in Nara Prefecture, Japan

Nanto Shichi Daiji (南都七大寺), literally "the seven great temples of the southern capital (meaning the city of Nara)", is a historical common name generally referring to the powerful and influential seven Buddhist temples located in the Nara prefecture. There have been some changes as to which temples are included over the years, since there have been fluctuations in power. The following is a list as it stood at the early stage, all of which were originally built by imperial order:

- Daian-ji (大安寺)
- Gangō-ji (元興寺)
- Hōryū-ji (法隆寺) (located close to the border of modern Nara city, in the town of Ikaruga, Nara)
- Kōfuku-ji (興福寺)
- Saidai-ji (西大寺)
- Tōdai-ji (東大寺)
- Yakushi-ji (薬師寺)

Sometimes the temples were called "the fifteen great temples of the southern capital" too, including other prestigious temples such as Tōshōdai-ji (唐招提寺) and Hokke-ji (法華寺).

== See also ==
- Nanto Rokushū
