= Buddhist temples in Japan =

Places of worship for Japanese Buddhists

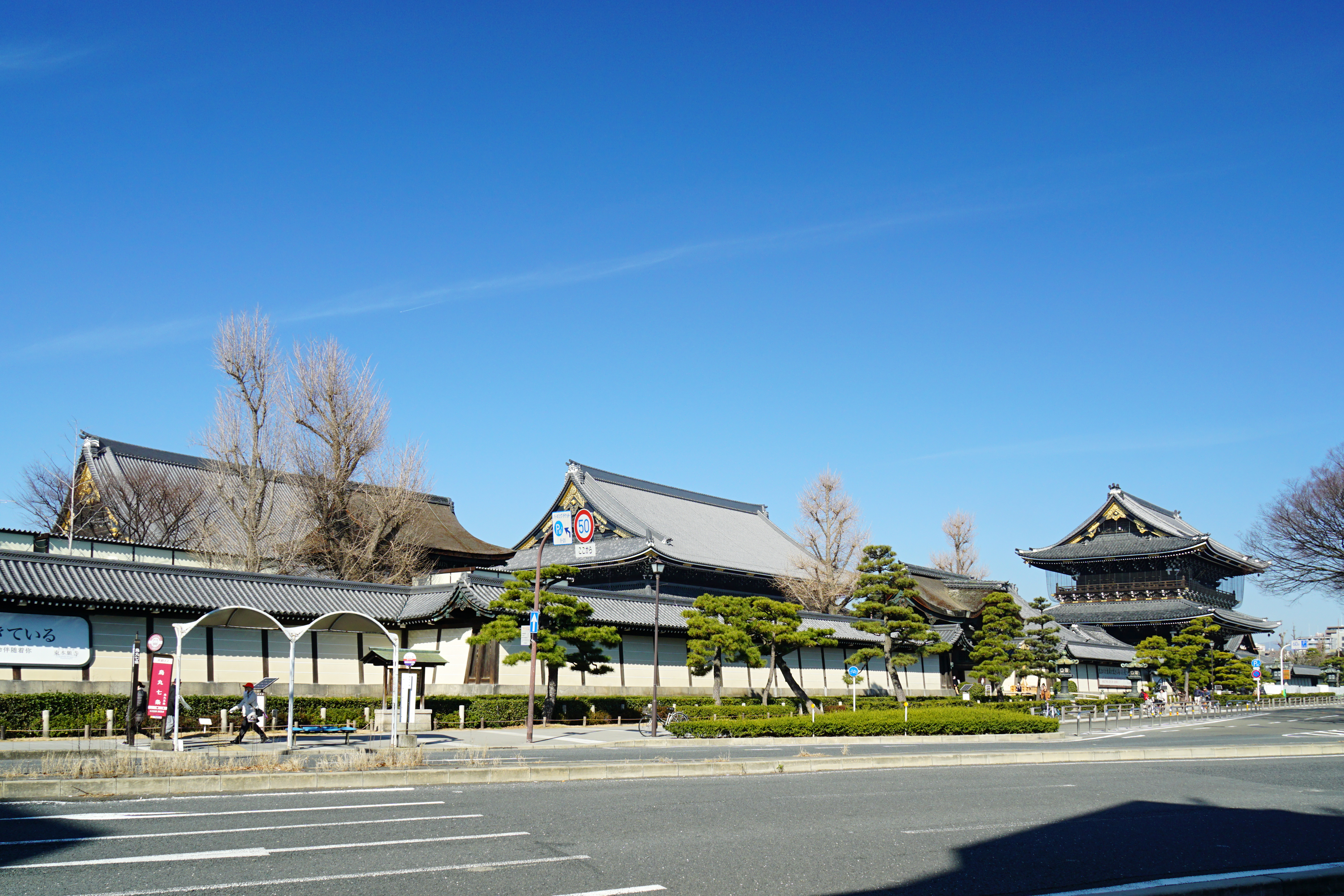
Higashi Hongan-ji in Kyoto

Buddhist temples or monasteries are (along with Shinto shrines) the most numerous, famous, and important religious buildings in Japan. (Note: The term "Shinto shrine" is used in contrast to "Buddhist temple" to mirror the distinction made in Japanese between Shinto and Buddhist religious structures. In Japanese the first are called jinja (神社), the second tera (寺).) The shogunates or leaders of Japan have made it a priority to update and rebuild Buddhist temples since the Momoyama period (late 16th century). The Japanese word for a Buddhist monastery is tera (寺) (kun reading), and the same kanji also has the pronunciation ji (on reading), so temple names frequently end in -dera (voiced) or -ji. Another ending, -in (院), is normally used to refer to minor temples. Examples of temple names that have these suffixes are Kiyomizu-dera, Enryaku-ji and Kōtoku-in.

== Etymology ==
The Japanese word for a Buddhist temple, tera (寺), was anciently also written phonetically 天良, tera, and is cognate with the Modern Korean Chǒl from Middle Korean Tiel, the Jurchen Taira and the reconstructed Old Chinese *dɘiaʁ, all meaning "Buddhist monastery". These words are apparently derived from the Aramaic word for "Monastery" dērā/ dairā/ dēr (from the root dwr "to live together"), rather than from the unrelated and later Indian word for monastery vihara, and may have been transmitted by the first Central Asian translators of Buddhist scriptures, such as An Shigao or Lokaksema.

== Buddhist and Shinto structures ==
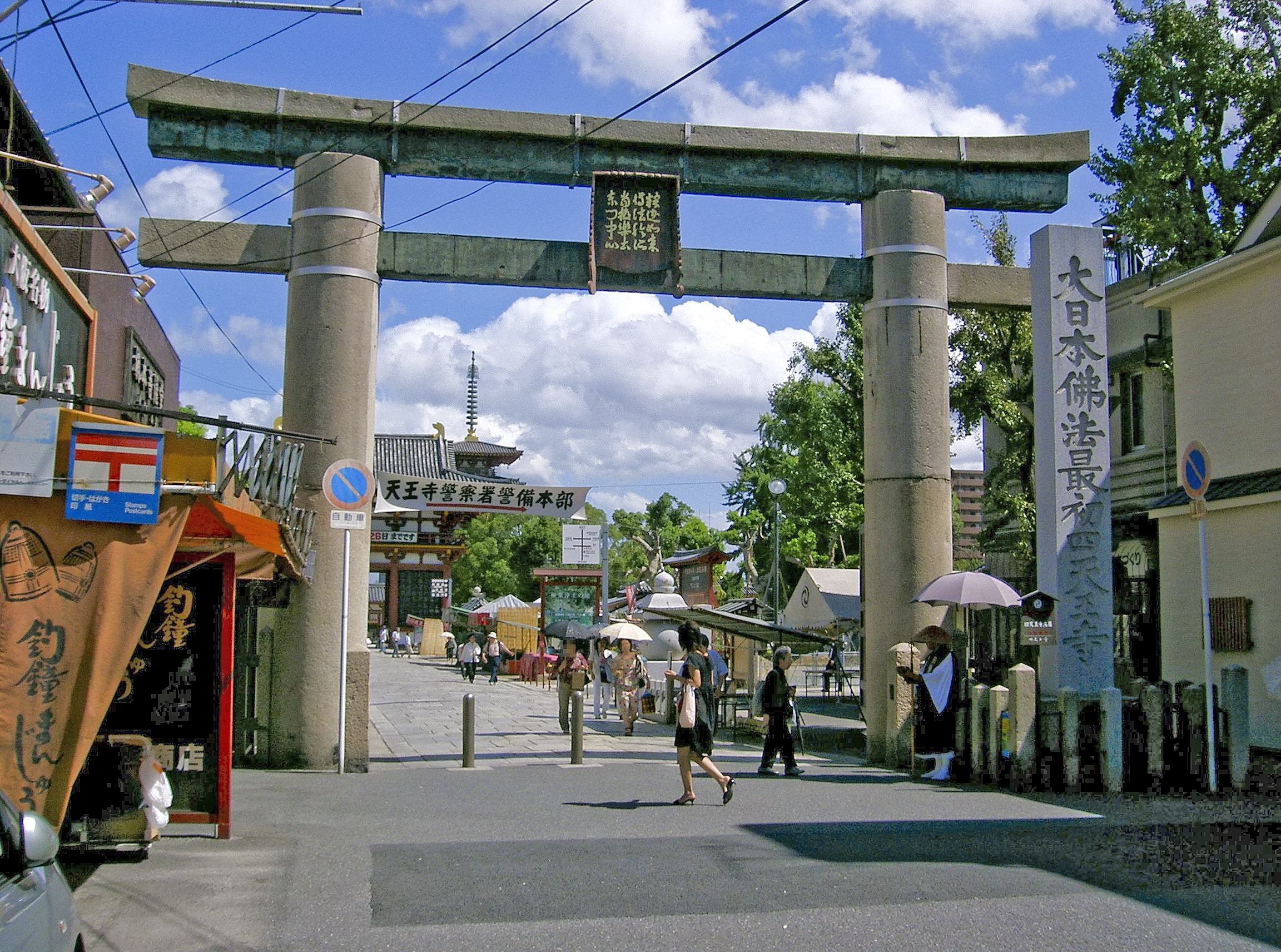
A torii at the entrance of Shitennō-ji, a Buddhist temple in Osaka

In Japan, Buddhist temples co-exist with Shinto shrines and both share the basic features of Japanese traditional architecture. Both torii and rōmon mark the entrance to a shrine, as well as to temples, although torii is associated with Shinto and rōmon with Buddhism. Some shrines, for example Iwashimizu Hachiman-gū, have a Buddhist-style main gate called sōmon. Many temples have a temizuya and komainu, like a shrine. Conversely, some shrines make use of incense or have a shōrō belltower. Others – for example, Tanzan Shrine in Nara – even have a pagoda.

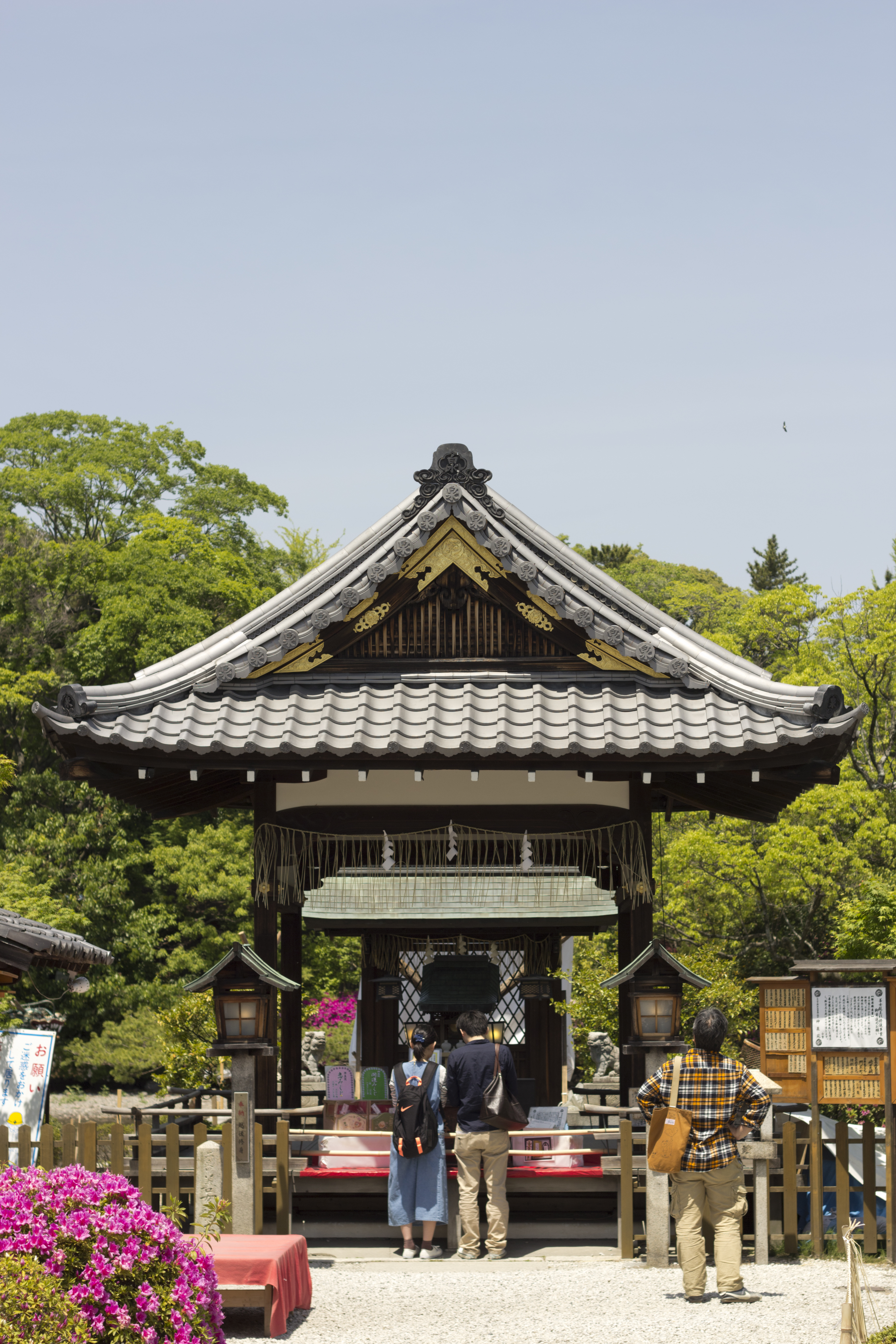
Honden of the Zennyo Ryūō shrine, inside a Shingon temple in Kyoto

Similarities between temples and shrines are also functional. Like a shrine, a Buddhist temple is not primarily a place of worship: its most important buildings are used for the safekeeping of sacred objects (the honzon, equivalent to a shrine's shintai) and are not accessible to worshipers. Unlike a Christian church, a temple is also a monastery. There are specialized buildings for certain rites, but these are usually open only to a limited number of participants. Religious mass gatherings do not take place with regularity as with Christian religions and are in any event not held inside the temple. If many people are involved in a ceremony, it will assume a festive character and will be held outdoors. The architectural elements of a Buddhist temple are meant to embody themes and teachings of Buddhism.

The reason for the great structural resemblances between the Buddhist temples and Shinto shrines lies in their common history. When Shintoism first encountered Buddhism it became more interpretive as it did not try to explain the universe as Buddhism sometimes tried to. It is normal for a temple to have been also a shrine, and obvious architectural differences between the two are few, such that often only a specialist will notice them. Many visitors to Buddhist temples and Shinto shrines go for similar reasons, such as prayer and for luck. The two religions coexist due to increased popularity of religions and the birth of new religions.

Shrines enshrining local kami existed long before the arrival of Buddhism, but they consisted either of demarcated land areas with no building, or of temporary shrines, erected when needed. With the arrival of Buddhism in Japan in the 6th century, shrines were subjected to its influence and adopted both the concept of permanent structures and the architecture of Buddhist temples.

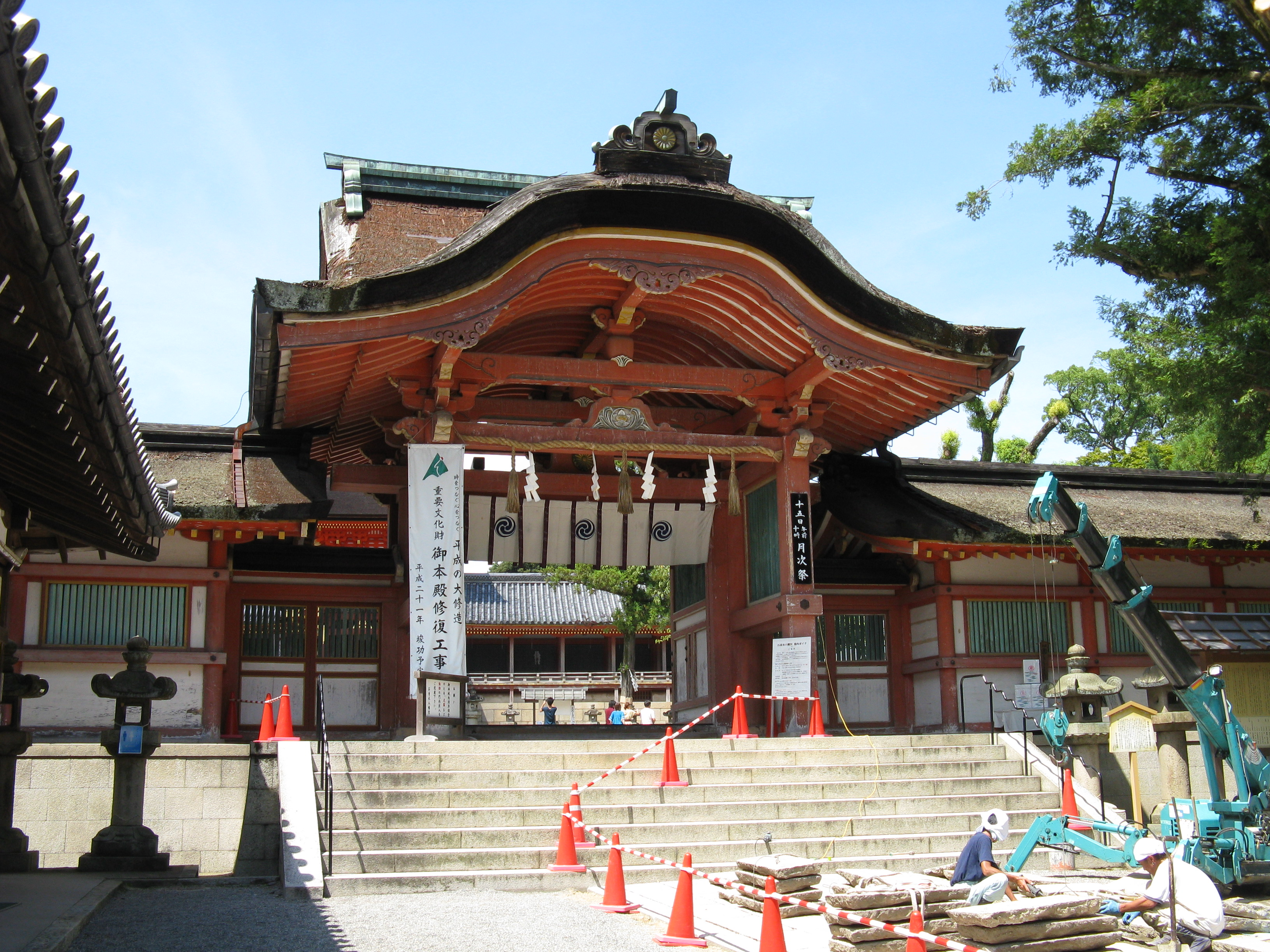
A Buddhist-style gate (karamon) at Iwashimizu Hachiman-gū

The successive development of shinbutsu-shūgō (syncretism of Buddhism and kami worship) and of the honji suijaku theory brought to the almost complete fusion of kami worship and Buddhism. It became normal for shrines to be accompanied by temples in mixed complexes called jingū-ji (神宮寺, lit. 'shrine temple') or miyadera (宮寺, lit. 'shrine temple'). (Note: The fact was reflected in their name. Kamakura's Tsurugaoka Hachiman-gū, for example, was then called Tsurugaoka Hachiman-gūji, or Tsurugaoka Shrine-temple.) The opposite was also common: most temples had at least a small shrine dedicated to its tutelary kami and were therefore called jisha (寺社, temple shrines). The Meiji era eliminated most jingūji, but left jisha intact, such that even today most temples have at least one shrine, sometimes very large, on their premises, and the Buddhist goddess Benzaiten is often worshiped at Shinto shrines. (Note: An extant example of the syncretic fusion of Buddhism and Shinto is Seiganto-ji, part of the Kumano Sanzan shrine complex. It is one of the few jingūji still in existence after the forced separation of Shinto and Buddhism by the Japanese government during the Meiji restoration. For details of the subject of shrine-temples, see the article Shinbutsu shūgō.)

As a consequence, for centuries shrines and temples had a symbiotic relationship where each influenced the other. Shrines took from Buddhism its gates (mon), the use of a hall for lay worshipers, the use of vermilion-colored wood and more, while Chinese Buddhist architecture was adapted to Japanese tastes with more asymmetrical layouts, greater use of natural materials, and an adaptation of the monastery to the pre-existing natural environment.

The clear separation between Buddhist temples and Shinto shrines, which today is the norm, emerges only as a result of the shinbutsu bunri ("separation of kami and Buddhas") law of 1868. This separation was mandated by law, and many shrine-temples were forced to become just shrines, among them famous ones like Usa Hachiman-gū and Tsurugaoka Hachiman-gū.

Because mixing the two religions was now forbidden, jingūji had to give away some of their properties or dismantle some of their buildings, thus damaging the integrity of their cultural heritage and decreasing the historical and economic value of their properties. For example, Tsurugaoka Hachiman-gū's giant Niō (the two wooden wardens usually found at the sides of a temple's entrance), being objects of Buddhist worship and therefore illegal where they were, were sold to Jufuku-ji, where they still are. The shrine-temple also had to destroy Buddhism-related buildings, for example its tahōtō, its midō and its shichidō garan.

== Architecture ==
=== General features ===
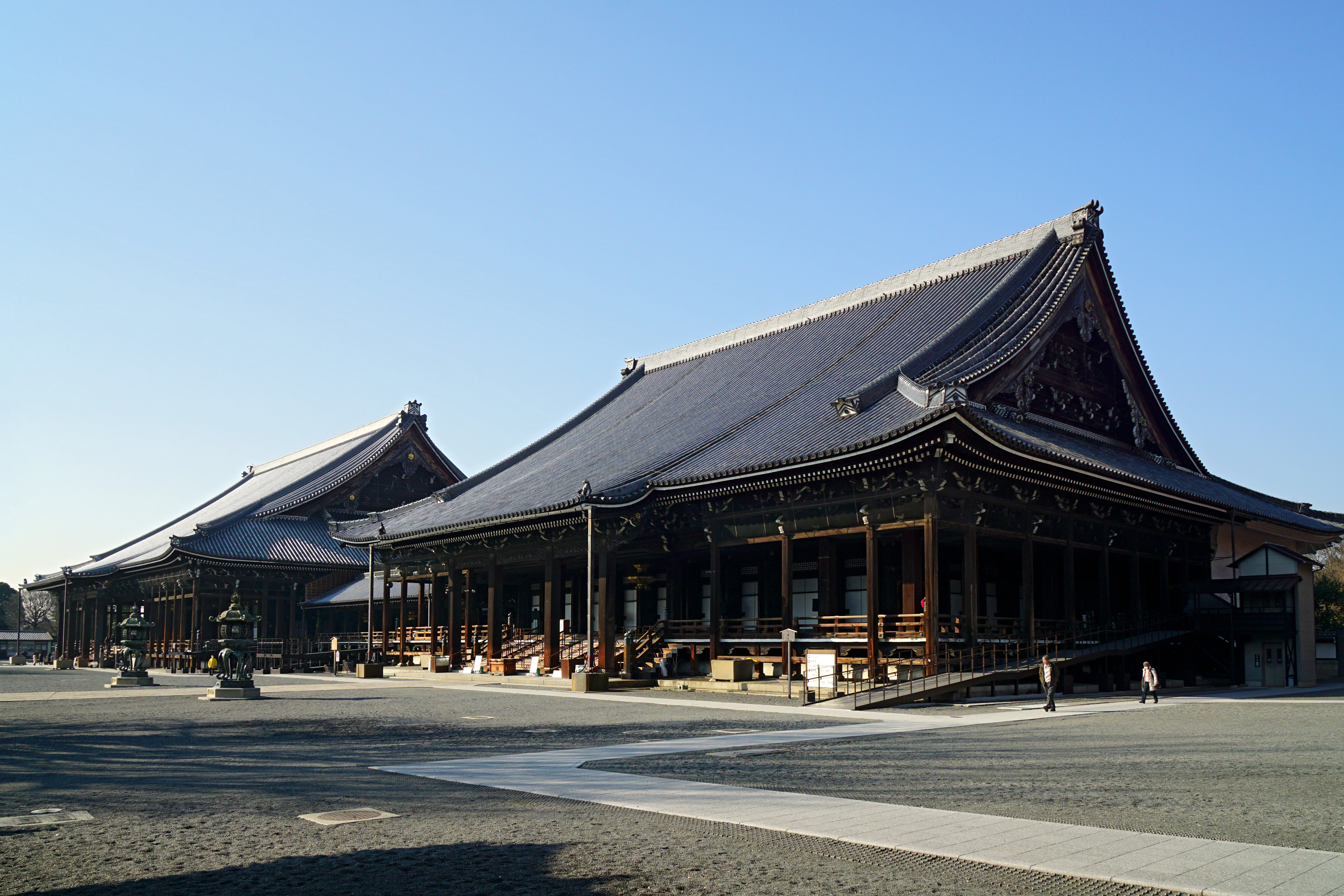
The roof is the dominant feature of a Buddhist temple.

Buddhist architecture in Japan is not native, but imported from China and other Asian cultures over the centuries with such constancy that the building styles of all Six Dynasties are represented. Its history is, as a consequence, dominated by Chinese and other Asian techniques and styles (present even in Ise Shrine, held to be the quintessence of Japanese architecture) on one side, and by Japanese original variations on those themes on the other.

Partly due also to the variety of climates in Japan and the millennium encompassed between the first cultural import and the last, the result is extremely heterogeneous, but several practically universal features can be found nonetheless. First of all is the choice of materials, always wood in various forms (planks, straw, tree bark, etc.) for almost all structures. Unlike both Western and some Chinese architecture, the use of stone is avoided except for certain specific uses, for example temple podia and pagoda foundations.

The general structure is almost always the same: post and lintel support a large and gently curved roof, while the walls are paper-thin, often movable and in any case non-carrying. The post and lintel structure embodies the Axis Mundi of an iconic form of the Buddha that is typically represented in pagodas and Indian stupas. Arches and barrel roofs are completely absent. Gable and eave curves are gentler than in China and columnar entasis (convexity at the center) limited.

The roof is the most visually impressive component, often constituting half the size of the whole edifice. The slightly curved eaves extend far beyond the walls, covering verandas, and their weight must therefore be supported by complex bracket systems called tokyō. These oversize eaves give the interior a characteristic dimness, which contributes to the temple's atmosphere. The interior of the building normally consists of a single room at the center called moya, from which sometimes depart other less important spaces, for example corridors called hisashi.

Inner space divisions are fluid, and room size can be modified through the use of screens or movable paper walls. The large, single space offered by the main hall can therefore be altered according to the need. The separation between inside and outside is itself in some measure not absolute as entire walls can be removed, opening the temple to visitors. Verandas appear to be part of the building to an outsider, but part of the external world to those in the temple. Structures are therefore made to a certain extent part of their environment. The use of construction modules keeps proportions between different parts of the edifice constant, preserving its overall harmony. (On the subject of temple proportions, see also the article ken).

Even in cases as that of Nikkō Tōshō-gū, where every available space is heavily decorated, ornamentation tends to follow, and therefore emphasize rather than hide, basic structures.

Being shared by both sacred and profane architecture, these architectonic features made it easy converting a lay building into a temple. This happened for example at Hōryū-ji, where a noblewoman's mansion was transformed into a religious building.

Buddhist architecture of the Heian period consisted of the re-emergence of national tastes. The temple Hojoji represents paradise and the pure land, which embodies elements of Pure Land Buddhism. The last formal temple was Motsuji.

Muroji is a temple complex found below the mountain of Mount Muro. The area behind the temple is sacred and is off limits to visitors and pilgrims. The caves of Mount Muro are especially sacred. The famous Dragon Cave is the thought to house the Dragon King who protects the country. This is an example of how natural elements are sacred aspects of Buddhist temples.

=== Four great temples of the seventh century ===
There are four great temples of the seventh century: Asukadera, Kudara Odera, Kawaradera and Yakushiji.

==== Asuka-Dera ====
This great hall had three golden halls and was the first full-scale temple. It was the most significant temple in the Asuka period. The founder of Asukadera was Soga no Umako and he had built a smaller scaled residence similar to the great hall. Many royal palaces were built in this natural environment for centuries later. When visited today it barely holds its grandeur it once had as there are no clear marks of where the original halls were and now the main scene is the parking lot with tour buses.

==== Kudara Odera ====
The foundation remains might be those of the remains found on the site of Kibi Pond (Kibi Ike). This grand temple had a nine-story pagoda that was constructed at the beginnings of Buddhism in Japan.

==== Kawaradera ====
The excavations and reconstruction of Kawaradera help to understand what it originally looked like. The plan originally had two golden halls with a pagoda and then residential spaces for monks. It was in an asymmetrical arrangement that was new and very innovative for this time. Sources lack in the history of its construction and who commissioned it.

==== Yakushiji ====
In the early eighth century this temple was constructed in Nara and has been reproduced into the original layout today. The monumental Yakushi triad exists here. The structure is in bright colors as it also would have originally been.

=== History ===
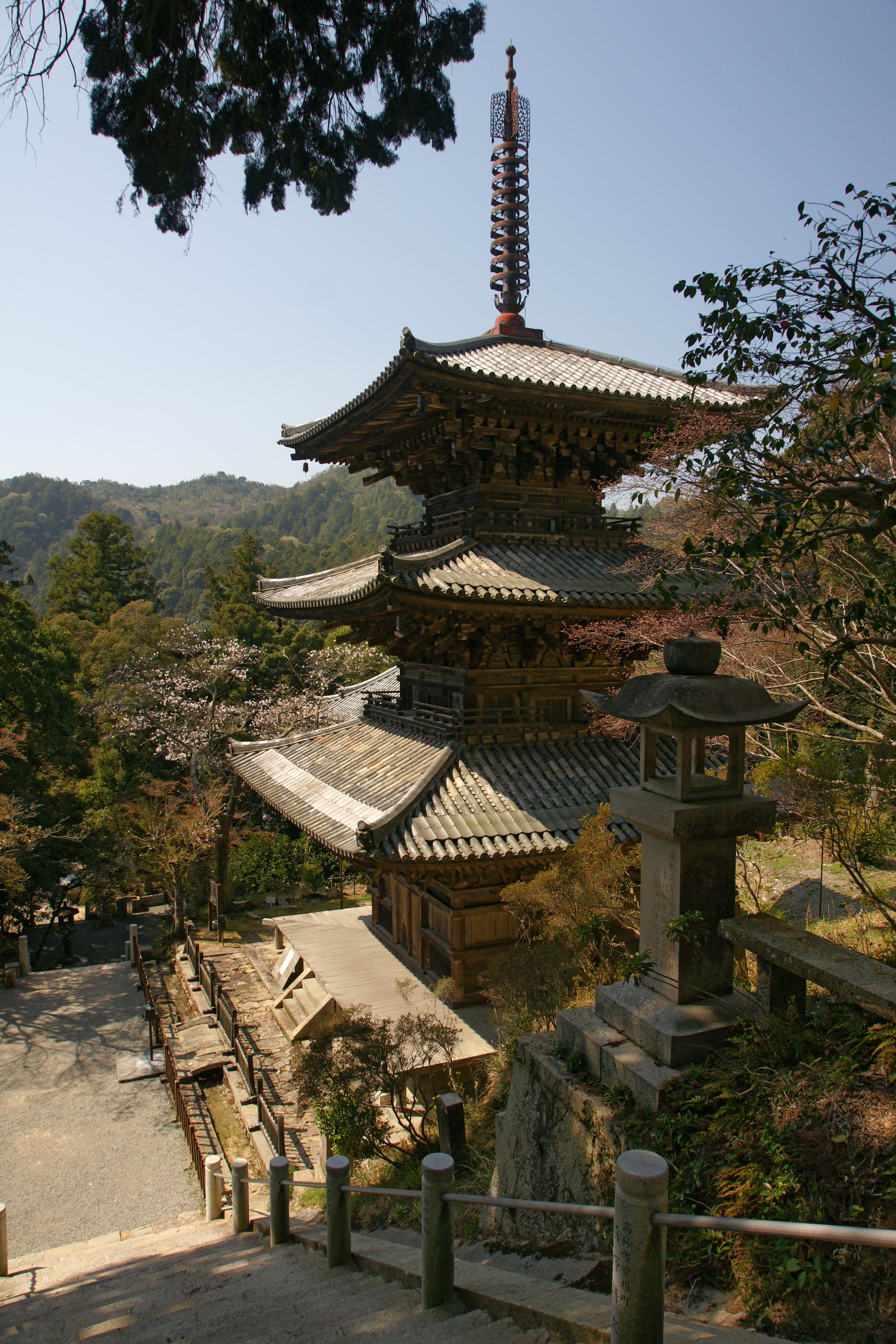
Ichijō-ji's pagoda, an example of the wayō style

The architecture of Buddhist temples, as that of any structure, has changed and developed over the centuries. However, while the particular details may vary, the general themes and styles have strong similarities and common origins.

The already mentioned Hōryū-ji was one of the first Buddhist temples built in Japan. Its primary structures represent the style current in 6th century CE Sui dynasty China. The Kondō (Golden Hall) is a double-roofed structure, supported by thick, strong pillars, and giving a feeling of boldness and weight.

Most Buddhist temples in Japan belong to one of four main styles:

- Wayō – A style developed in art and architecture in Japan during the Heian period by the esoteric sects Tendai and Shingon on the basis of contemporary Chinese architecture. So called to distinguish it from imported Chinese styles, in architecture it was characterized by simplicity, refraining from ornamentation, use of natural timber and in general plain materials.
- Daibutsuyō – a Japanese religious architectural style that emerged in the late 12th or early 13th century on the basis of contemporary Chinese architecture. Introduced by priest Chōgen, this grandiose and monumental style was based on Song dynasty architecture and was the antithesis of the simple and traditional wayō style. The Nandaimon at Tōdai-ji and the Amida Hall at Jōdo-ji are the only extant examples of this style.
- Zenshūyō – A style that takes its name from its creators, the Buddhist Zen sect, and which emerged in the late 12th or early 13th century on the basis of contemporary Chinese architecture. The zenshūyō was originally called karayō (唐様, Chinese style) but, like the Daibutsu style, was renamed by Ōta Hirotarō, a 20th-century scholar. Its characteristics are earthen floors, decorative curved pent roofs (mokoshi) and pronouncedly curved main roofs, cusped windows (katōmado) and paneled doors. Typical of the style is also the main hall (Butsuden), which has just one story but seems to have two because it has a covered pent roof called mokoshi.
- Setchūyō – an architectural style born in Japan during the Muromachi period from the fusion of elements from three preceding styles, the wayō, the daibutsuyō and zen'yō. It is exemplified by the main hall at Kakurin-ji. The combination of wayō and daibutsuyō in particular became so frequent that sometimes it is classed separately by scholars under the name Shin-wayō (新和様, new wayō).

=== Layout and geomantic positioning ===
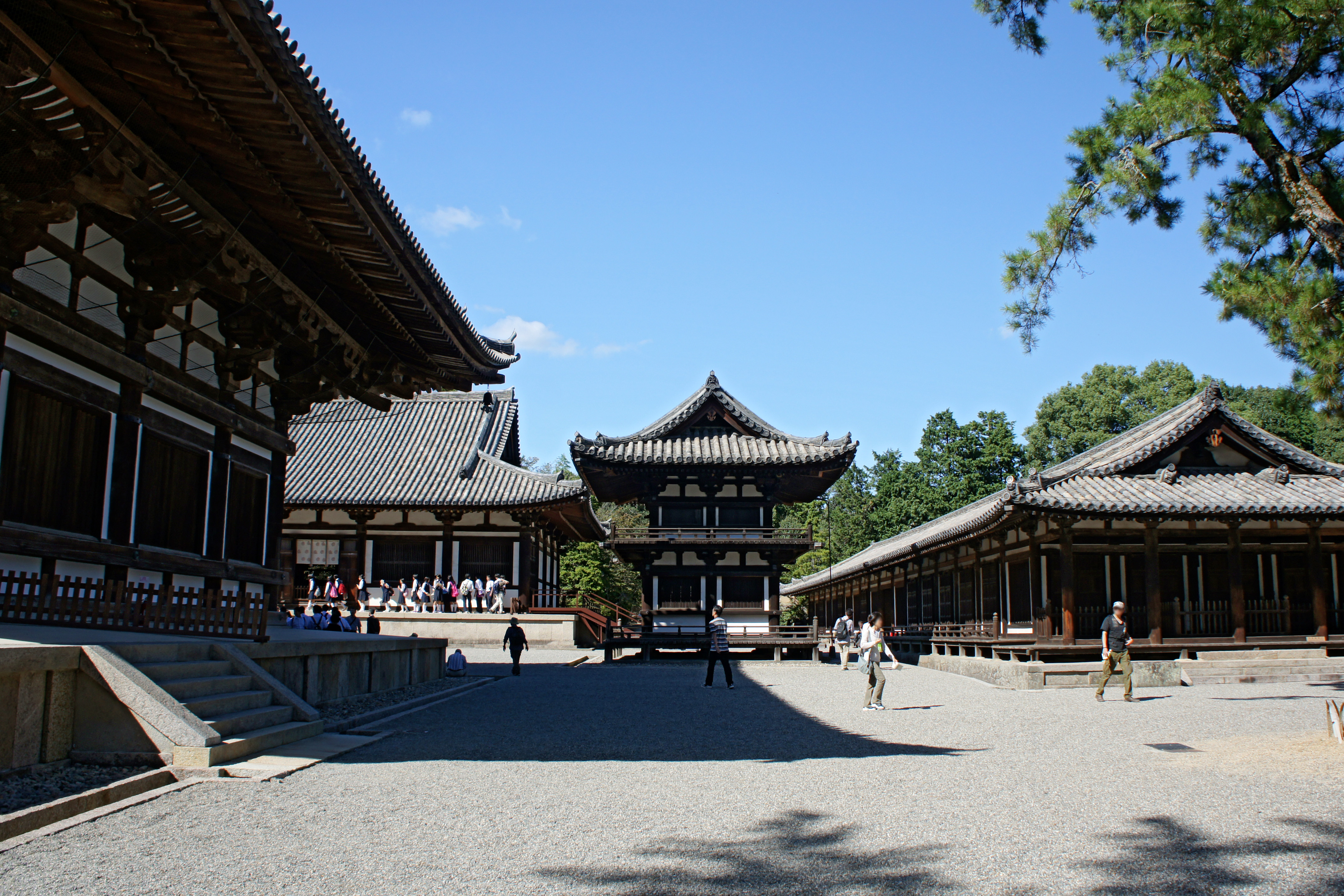
Part of Tōshōdai-ji's garan (left to right, the kondō, the kōdō, the korō and the Raiō)

Buddhist temple complexes consist of a number of structures arranged according to certain concepts or guidelines.

The arrangement of the major buildings (garan haichi (伽藍配置)) changed over time. An early pattern had a gate, tower, kondō and kodō in a straight line from south to north. Corridors extended east and west from the flanks of the gate, then turned north, and finally joined north of the kōdo, forming a cloister around the pagoda and the major halls. This pattern, typified by Shitennō-ji in Osaka, came from China via Baekje. The Chinese style of Buddhist temples ultimately was based on that of Chinese palaces, and this is evident in many of the basic design features that remain today in the temples of all three countries. Also, the "one pagoda three main halls" structure of Goguryeo in which buildings surround an octagonal multi-story wooden pagoda is thought to have influenced Asuka-dera.

A Buddhist temple complex in Japan generally follows the pattern of a series of sacred spaces encircling a courtyard, and entered via a set of gates. These gates will typically have a pair of large guardian statues, called Niō.

In addition, many of the more important or powerful temples are built in locations that are favorable according to the precepts of Chinese geomancy. For example, Enryaku-ji, which sits atop Mount Hiei to the north-east of Kyoto, is said to defend the city from evil spirits by being placed in that direction. The arrangements of mountains and other geographic features in particular directions around the temple play important roles as well. This custom continued for a long time. Eight centuries after the founding of Enryaku-ji, the Tokugawa shogunate established Kan'ei-ji in a similar direction for the protection of their Edo Castle. Its mountain-name, Mount Tōei (東叡山 Tōei-zan), takes a character from Mount Hiei (比叡山 Hiei-zan), and can be interpreted as meaning "the Mount Hiei of the East".

Kamakura's Tsurugaoka Hachiman-gū is now only a Shinto shrine but, before the Shinto and Buddhism Separation Order (神仏判然令) of 1868, its name was Tsurugaoka Hachiman-gū-ji (鶴岡八幡宮寺, Tsurugaoka Hachiman Shrine Temple) and it was also a Buddhist temple, one of the oldest of the city. The temple and the city were built with Feng Shui in mind. The present location was carefully chosen as the most propitious after consulting a diviner because it had a mountain to the north (the Hokuzan (北山)), a river to the east (the Namerikawa) and a great road to the west (the Kotō Kaidō (古東街道)), and was open to the south (on Sagami Bay). Each direction was protected by a god: Genbu guarded the north, Seiryū the east, Byakko the west and Suzaku the south. The willows near the ponds and the catalpas next to the Museum of Modern Art represent respectively Seiryū and Byakko.

Geomancy lost in importance during the Heian period as temple layout was adapted to the natural environment, disregarding feng shui.

In addition to geomantic considerations, Buddhist temples, like any other religious structures, need to be organized in order to best serve their various purposes. The most important space in any Buddhist temple complex is the sacred space where images of Buddhas and bodhisattvas are kept, and where important rituals are performed.

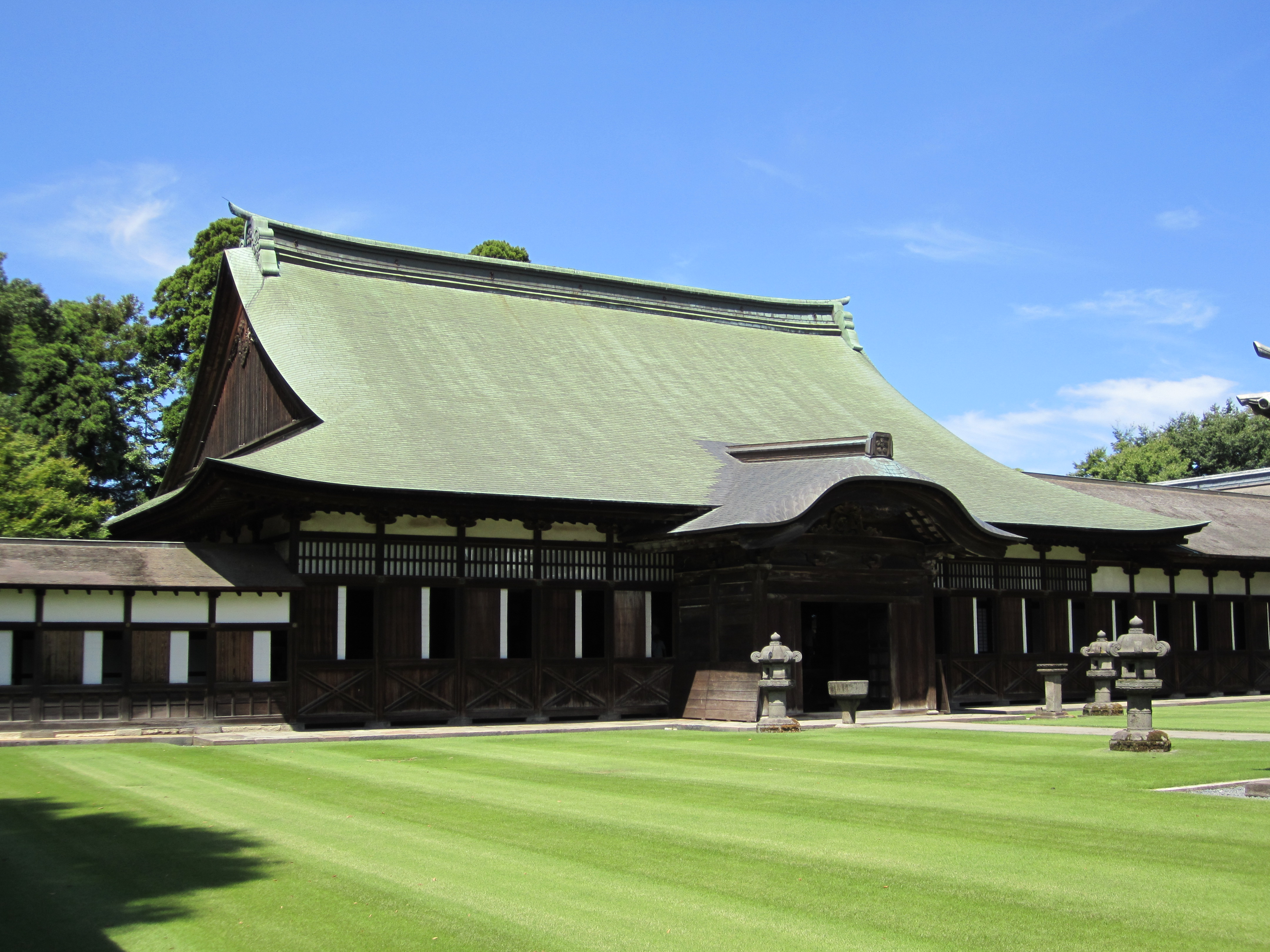
Hattō at Zuiryū-ji

These areas are always separated from those accessible to the lay worshipers, though the distance between the two and the manner of their separation is quite varied. In many temples, there is little more than a wooden railing dividing the sacred space with that of the laypeople, but in many others there is a significant distance, perhaps a graveled courtyard, between the two.

Another structure or space of great importance accommodates the physical day-to-day needs of the clergy. Spaces for eating, sleeping and studying are essential, particularly in those temples that serve as monasteries.

According to a 13th-century text, "a garan is a temple with a kon-dō (main hall), a tō (pagoda), a kō-dō (lecture hall), a shōrō (belfry), a jiki-dō (refectory), a sōbō (monks' living quarters), and a kyōzō (scriptures deposit, library)." These are the seven listed as shichidō elements of a Nanto Rokushū (南都六宗, Nara six sects) temple.

A 15th-century text describes how Zen school temples (Sōtō (曹洞), Rinzai (臨済)) included a butsuden or butsu-dō (main hall), a hattō (lecture hall), a kuin (kitchen/office), a sō-dō (building dedicated to Zazen), a sanmon (main gate), a tōsu (toilet) and a yokushitsu (bath).

== Common temple features ==
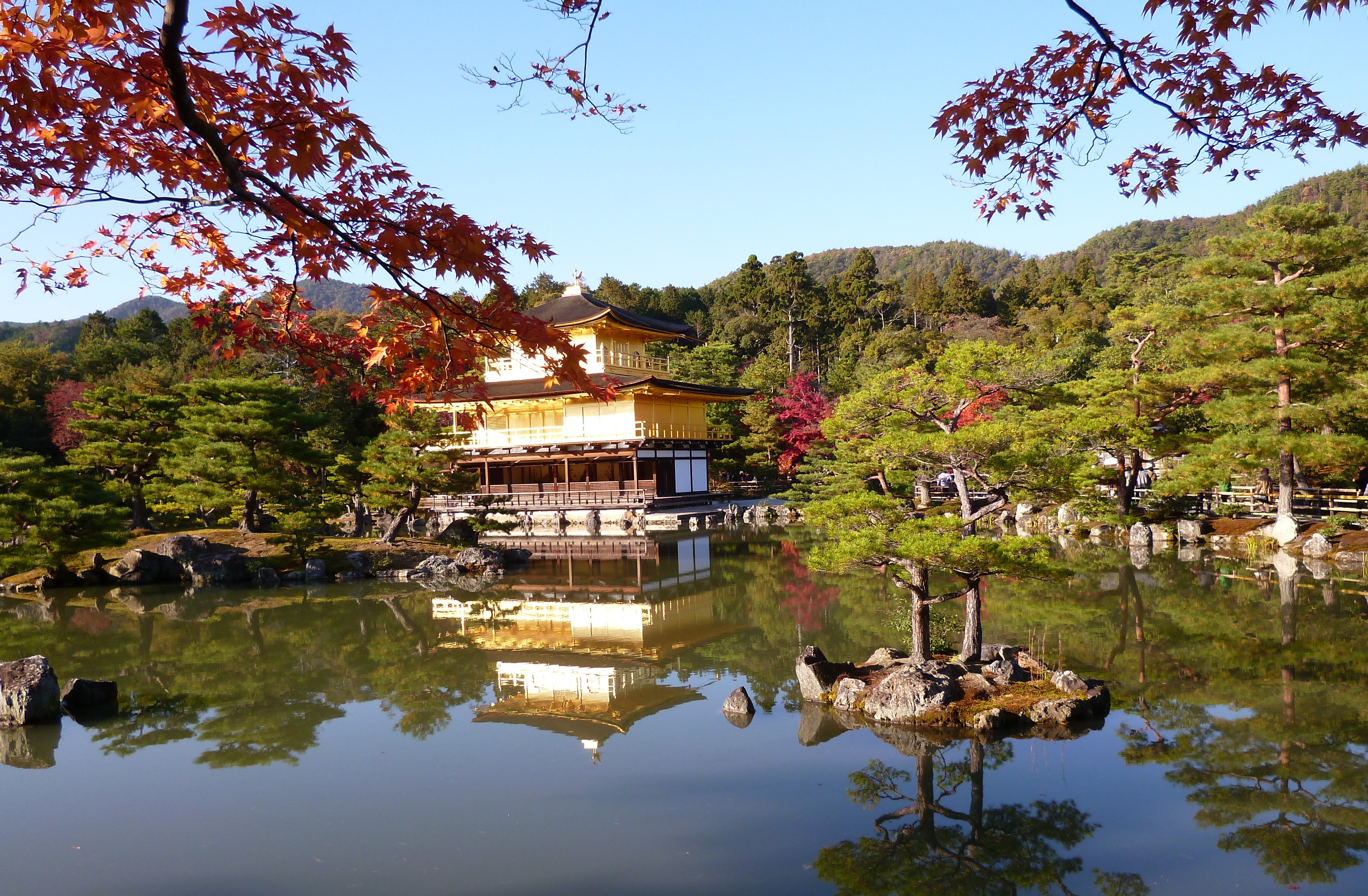
Buddhist temple of Kinkaku-ji, declared World Heritage Site by UNESCO

- Butsuden or Butsu-dō (仏殿・仏堂) – lit. "Hall of Buddha".
  - A Zen temple's main hall. Seems to have two stories, but has in fact only one and measures either 3×3 or 5×5 bays.
  - Any building enshrining the statue of Buddha or of a bodhisattva and dedicated to prayer.
- chinjusha (鎮守社/鎮主社) – a small shrine built at a Buddhist temple and dedicated to its tutelary kami.
- chōzuya (手水舎) – see temizuya.
- chūmon (中門) – in a temple, the gate after the naindaimon connected to a kairō. See also mon.
- dō (堂) – Lit. hall. Suffix for the name of the buildings part of a temple. The prefix can be the name of a deity associated with it (e.g. Yakushi-dō, or Yakushi hall) or express the building's function within the temple's compound (e.g. hon-dō, or main hall). See also Butsu-dō, hō-dō, hon-dō, jiki-dō, kaisan-dō, kō-dō, kon-dō, kyō-dō, mandara-dō, miei-dō, mi-dō, sō-dō, Yakushi-dō and zen-dō.
- garan – see shichi-dō garan.
- hattō (法堂) – lit. "Dharma hall". A building dedicated to lectures by the chief priest on Buddhism's scriptures (the hō).
- hōjō (方丈) – the living quarters of the head priest of a Zen temple.
- Hokke-dō (法華堂) – lit. "Lotus Sūtra hall". In Tendai Buddhism, a hall whose layout allows walking around a statue for meditation. The purpose of walking is to concentrate on the Hokekyō and seek the ultimate truth.
- honbō (本坊) – residence of the jushoku, or head priest, of a temple.
- kairō (回廊・廻廊) – a long and roofed portico-like passage connecting two buildings.
- kaisan-dō (開山堂) – founder's hall, usually at a Zen temple. Building enshrining a statue, portrait or memorial tablet of the founder of either the temple or the sect it belongs to. Jōdo sect temples often call it miei-dō.
- karamon (唐門) – generic term for a gate with an arched roof. See also mon.
- karesansui (枯山水) – lit. dry landscape. A Japanese rock garden, often present in Zen temples, and sometimes found in temples of other sects too.
- katōmado (華頭窓) – a bell shaped window originally developed at Zen temples in China, but widely used by other Buddhist sects as well as in lay buildings.
- kon-dō (金堂) – lit. "golden hall", it is the main hall of a garan, housing the main object of worship. Unlike a butsuden, it is a true two-story building (although the second story may sometimes be missing) measuring 9×7 bays.
- konrō (軒廊) – covered corridor between two buildings
- korō or kurō (鼓楼) – tower housing a drum that marks the passing of time. It used to face the shōrō and lie next to the kō-dō, but now the drum is usually kept in the rōmon.
- kuin* (庫院) – kitchen/office of a Zen garan. A building hosting the galleys, the kitchen, and the offices of a temple. Usually situated in front and to the side of the butsuden, facing the sō-dō. Also called kuri.
- kuri (庫裏) – see kuin
- kyō-dō (経堂) – see kyōzō.
- kyōzō (経蔵) – lit. "scriptures deposit". Repository of sūtras and books about the temple's history. Also called kyō–dō.
- miei-dō (御影堂) – lit. "image hall". Building housing an image of the temple's founder, equivalent to a Zen sect's kaisan-dō.
- mi-dō (御堂) – a generic honorific term for a building which enshrines a sacred statue.
- Miroku Nyorai (弥勒如来) – Japanese name of Maitreya.
- mon (門) – a temple's gate, which can be named after its position (nandaimon: lit. "great southern gate"), its structure (nijūmon: "two storied gate"), a deity (Niōmon: lit. "Nio gate"), or its use (onarimon: lit. "imperial visit gate", a gate reserved to the Emperor). The same gate can therefore be described using more than one term. For example, a Niōmon can at the same time be a nijūmon.
- nandaimon (南大門) – the main southern gate of a temple, in particular that at Nara's Tōdai-ji. See also mon.
- nijūmon (二重門) – a two-storied gate with a roof surrounding the first floor. See also mon.
- Niōmon (仁王門 or 二王門) – a two-storied or high gate guarded by two wooden guardians called Niō. See also mon.
- noborirō (登廊) – a covered stairway at Nara's Hase-dera.
- pagoda – see stupa and tō.
- rōmon (楼門) - a high gate with two floors, only one of which has usable space, surrounded by a balcony and topped by a roof. Buddhist in origin, it is used also in Shinto shrines.
- sai-dō (斎堂) – the refectory at a Zen temple or monastery. See also jiki-dō.
- sandō (参道) - the approach leading from a torii to a shrine. The term is also used sometimes at Buddhist temples too.
- sanmon (三門 or 山門) – the gate in front of the butsuden. The name is short for Sangedatsumon (三解脱門), lit. Gate of the three liberations. Its three openings (kūmon (空門), musōmon (無相門) and muganmon (無願門)) symbolize the three gates to enlightenment. Entering, one can free himself from three passions (貪 ton, or greed, 瞋 shin, or hatred, and 癡 chi, or "foolishness"). See also mon. Its size depends on the temple's rank. (See photos.)
- sanrō (山廊) – small buildings at the ends of a two-storied Zen gate containing the stairs to the second story.
- sekitō (石塔) – a stone pagoda (stupa). See also tō
- shichidō garan (七堂伽藍) – a double compound term literally meaning "seven halls" (七堂) and "(temple) buildings" (伽藍). What is counted in the group of seven buildings, or shichidō, can vary greatly from temple to temple and from school to school. In practice, shichidō garan can also mean simply a large complex.
  - Nanto Rokushū and later non-Zen schools: The shichidō garan in this case includes a kon-dō, a tō, a kō-dō, a shōrō, a jiki-dō, a sōbō, and a kyōzō.
  - Zen schools: A Zen shichidō garan includes a butsuden or butsu-dō, a hattō, a ku'in, a sō-dō, a sanmon, a tōsu and a yokushitsu.
- shoin (書院) – originally a study and a place for lectures on the sutra within a temple, later the term came to mean just a study.
- shōrō (鐘楼) – a temple's belfry, a building from which a bell is hung.
- sōbō (僧坊) – The monks' living quarters in a non-Zen garan
- sō-dō (僧堂) – Lit. "monk hall". A building dedicated to the practice of Zazen. It used to be dedicated to all kinds of activities, from eating to sleeping, centered on zazen.
- sōmon (総門) – the gate at the entrance of a temple. It precedes the bigger and more important sanmon. See also mon.
- sōrin (相輪) – a spire reaching up from the center of the roof of some temple halls, tiered like a pagoda.
- sotoba or sotōba (卒塔婆) – transliteration of the Sanskrit stupa.
  - A pagoda. Tower with an odd number of tiers (three, five, seven nine, or thirteen). See also stupa.
  - Strips of wood left behind tombs during annual ceremonies (tsuizen) symbolizing a stupa. The upper part is segmented like a pagoda and carries Sanskrit inscriptions, sutras, and the kaimyō (posthumous name) of the deceased.

In present-day Japanese, sotoba usually has the latter meaning.

- stupa – in origin a vessel for Buddha's relics, later also a receptacle for scriptures and other relics. Its shape changed in the Far East under the influence of the Chinese watchtower to form tower-like structures like the Tōbuttō, the gorintō, the hōkyōintō, the sekitō, the tō, or the much simpler wooden stick-style sotoba.
- tatchū (塔頭 or 塔中)
  - In Zen temples, a building containing a pagoda enshrining the ashes of an important priest stands.
  - Later, it became a subsidiary temple or a minor temple depending from a larger one.
  - Finally, it became also subsidiary temple being the family temple (bodaiji) of an important family.
- tahōtō (多宝塔) – a two-storied pagoda with a ground floor having a dome-shaped ceiling and a square pent roof, a round second floor and square roofs.
- temizuya (手水舎) – a fountain near the entrance of a shrine and a temple where worshipers can cleanse their hands and mouths before worship.
- tesaki (手先) – Term used to count the roof-supporting brackets (tokyō (斗きょう)) projecting from a temple's wall, usually composed of two steps (futatesaki (二手先))) or three (mitesaki 三津手先).
- tokyō (斗きょう) – see tesaki.
- torii (鳥居)- the iconic Shinto gate at the entrance of a sacred area, usually, but not always, a shrine. Shrines of various size can be found next to, or inside temples.
- tōrō (灯籠) – a lantern at a shrine or Buddhist temple. Some of its forms are influenced by the gorintō.
- -tō (塔)
  - A pagoda, and an evolution of the stupa. After reaching China, the stupa evolved into a tower with an odd number of tiers (three, five, seven, nine, thirteen), excepted the tahōtō, which has two.
  - The word is used together as a suffix of a numeral indicating the number of a pagoda's tiers (three tiers= san-jū-no-tō, five tiers= go-jū-no-tō, seven tiers = nana-jū-no-tō, etc.).
- tōsu or tōshi (東司) – a Zen monastery's toilet.
- Yakushi-dō (薬師堂) – a building that enshrines a statue of Yakushi Nyorai.*
- yokushitsu* (浴室) – a monastery's bathroom.
- zen-dō (禅堂) – lit. "hall of Zen". The building where monks practice zazen, and one of the main structures of a Zen garan.

== Temple names ==
A temple's name (jigō (寺号) or jimyō (寺名)) is usually made of three parts. The first is the sangō (山号, mountain name), the second is the ingō (院号, cloister name) and the third is the san'in-jigō (山院寺号, temple name).

=== Sangō ===
Even though they may be located at the bottom of a valley, temples are metaphorically called mountains and even the numbers used to count them carry the ending -san or -zan (山), hence the name sangō. This tradition goes back to the times when temples were primarily monasteries purposely built in remote mountainous areas. The founding of a temple is called kaisan (開山, lit. 'opening of the mountain') for this reason.

No fixed rules for its formation exist, but the sangō is basically topographical in origin, as in Hieizan Enryaku-ji: these two names together mean "Mount Hiei's Enryaku-ji". For this reason it is sometimes used as a personal name, particularly in Zen. There may be however some other semantic relationship between the sangō and the san'in-jigō, as for example in the case of Rurikōzan Yakushi-ji. The sangō and the jigō are simply different names of the same god. Sometimes the sangō and the jigō are both posthumous names, for example of the founder's mother and father.

=== Ingō ===
The character in (院), which gives the ingō its name, originally indicated an enclosure or section and therefore, by analogy, it later came to mean a cloister in a monastery. It is in this sense which it is applied to temples or, more often, subtemples. It can be also found in the name of formerly minor temples risen by chance to great prominence. For example, Kawagoe's Kita-in used to be one of three subtemples of a temple which no longer exist. Less frequent in an ingō are -an (庵, hermitage) and -bō (坊, monk's living quarters). -dō (堂, hall) is normally used in the name of particular buildings of a temple's compound, e.g. Kannon-dō, but can be employed as a name of minor or small temples.

=== Jigō ===
The only name in common use is however the jigō, (ending in -ji, -tera, -dera (〜寺; ... temple)) which can then be considered the main one. The sangō and ingō are not, and never were, in common use. The character -ji it contains is sometimes pronounced tera or dera as in Kiyomizu-dera, normally when the rest of the name is an indigenous name (kun'yomi).

=== Unofficial names ===
Temples are sometimes known by an unofficial but popular name. This is usually topographical in origin, as for example in the case of Asakusa's Sensō-ji, also known as Asakusa-dera. A temple can also be named after a special or famous characteristic, as for example in the case Kyoto's Saihō-ji, commonly called Koke-dera, or "moss temple" because of its famous moss garden. Unofficial names can have various other origins.

== Gallery ==
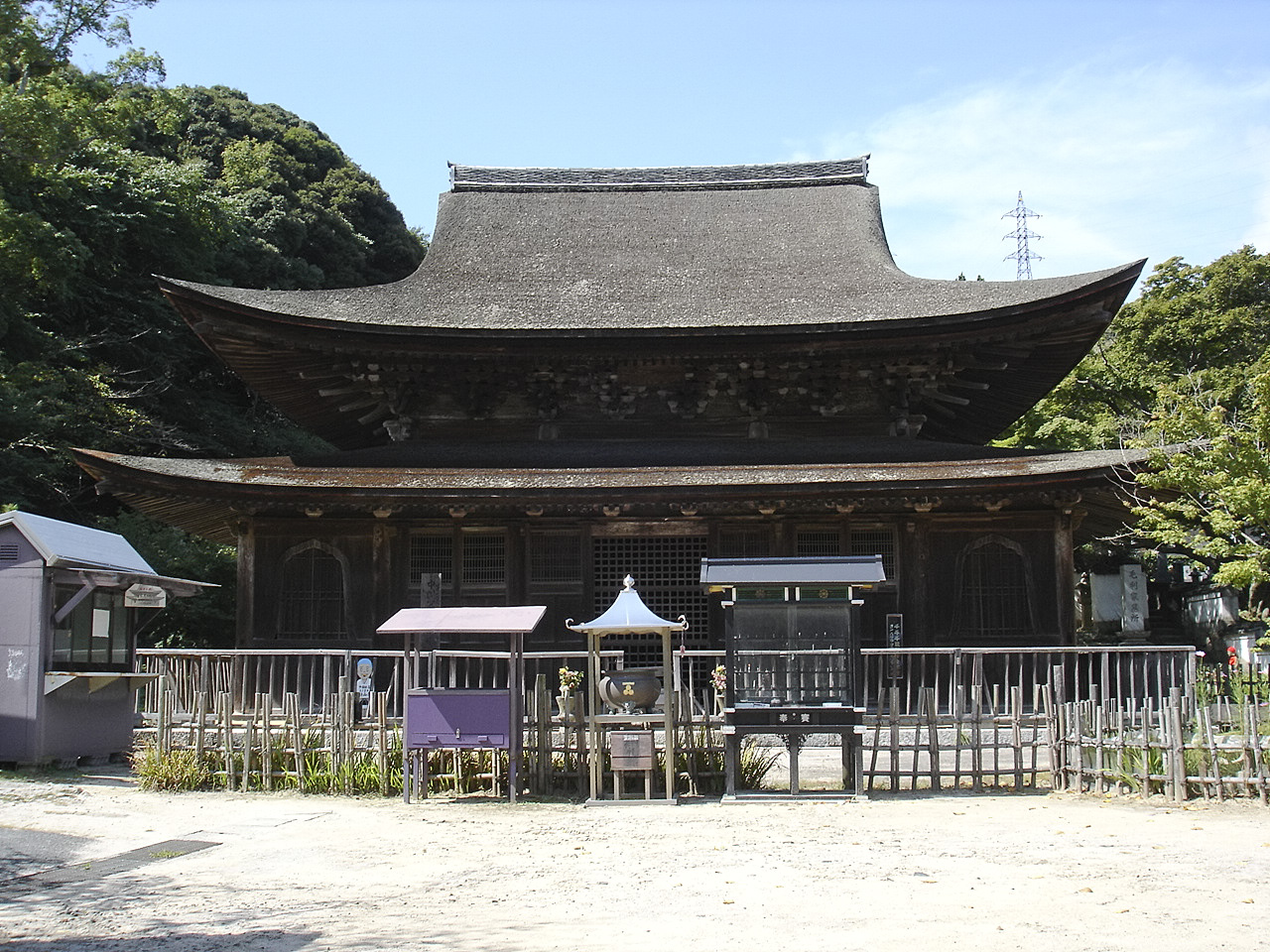
Kōzan-ji's Butsuden in Shimonoseki

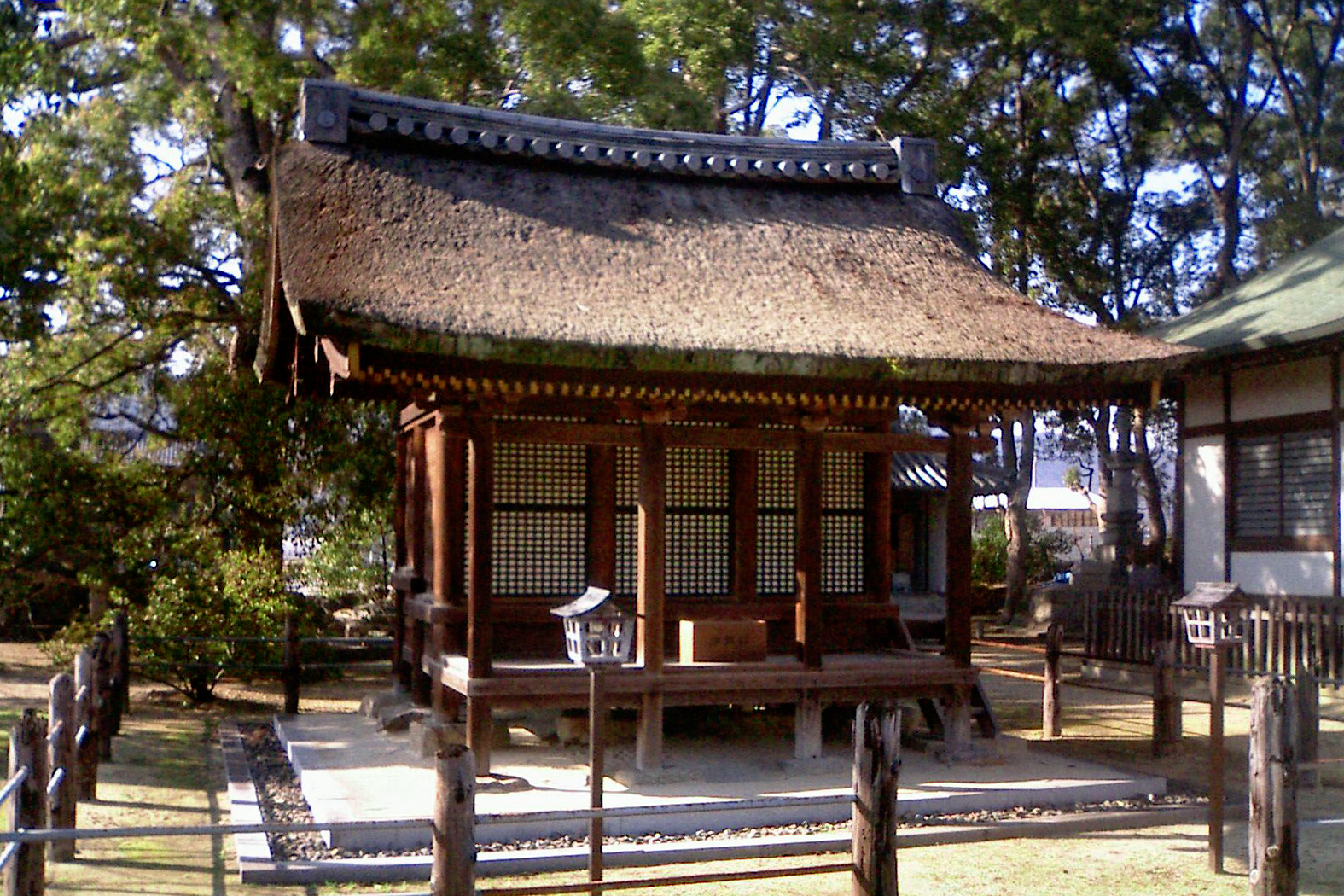
Motoyama-ji's chinjū-dō

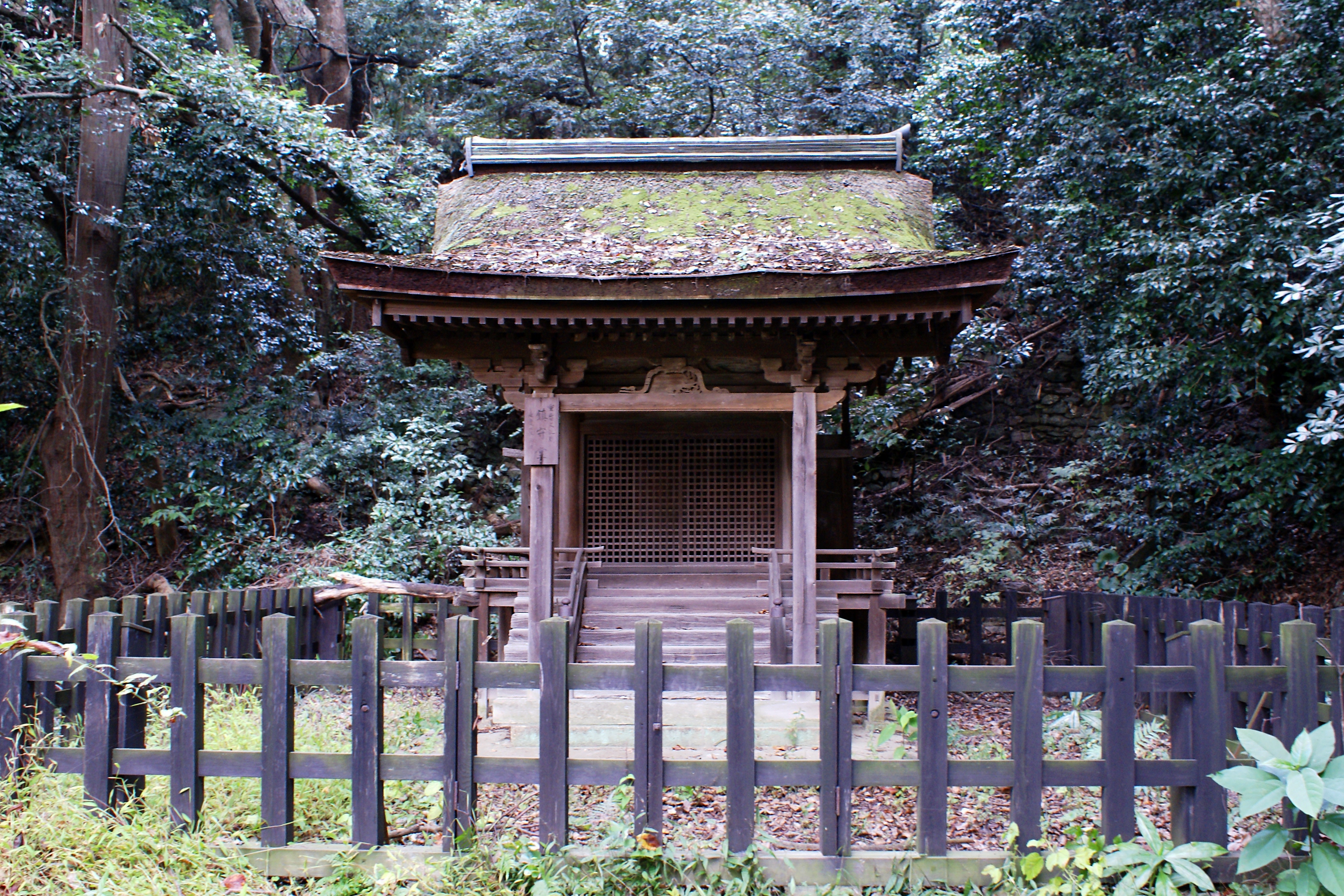
Chōhō-ji's chinjū-dō

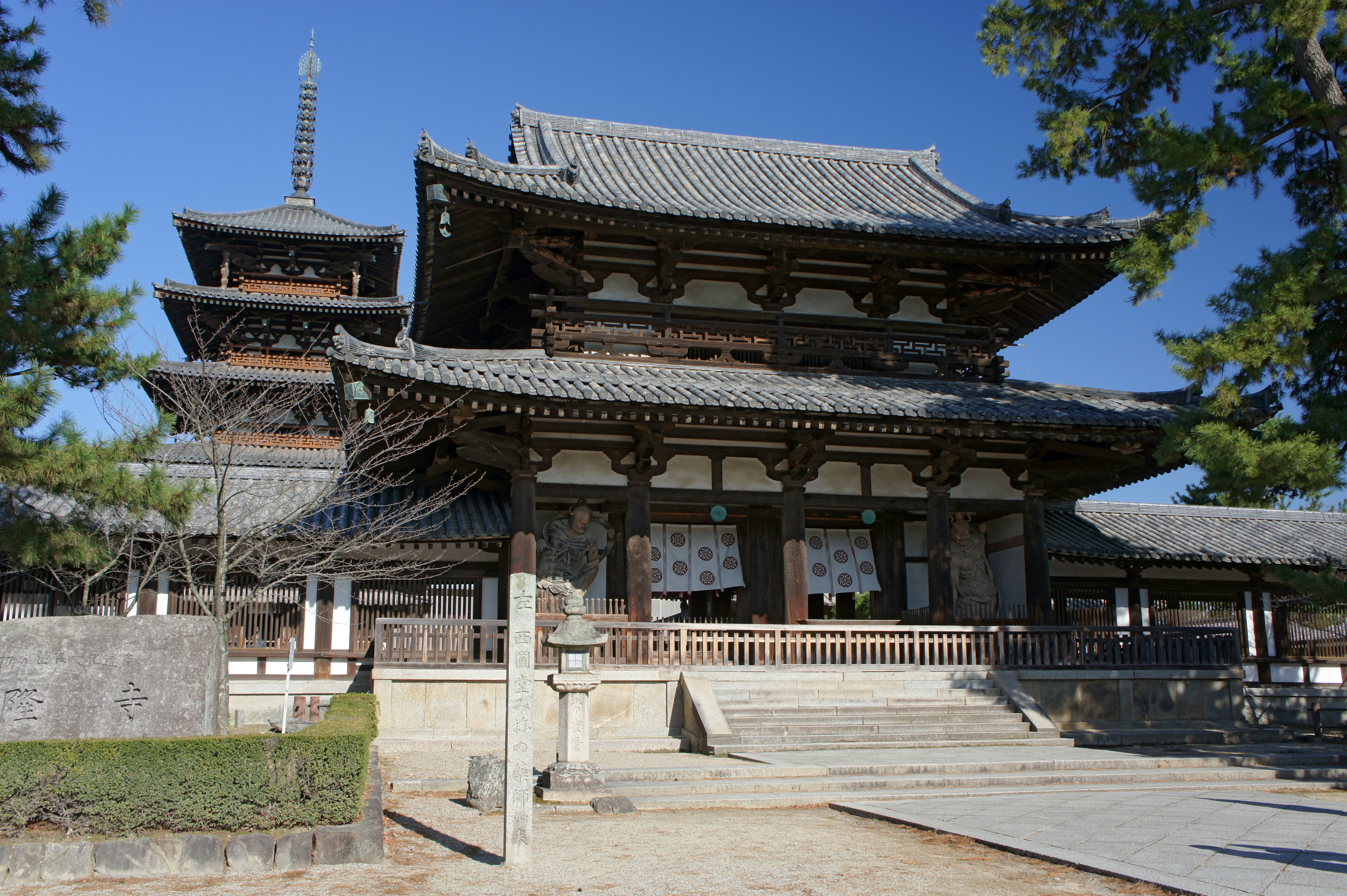
Chūmon at Hōryū-ji

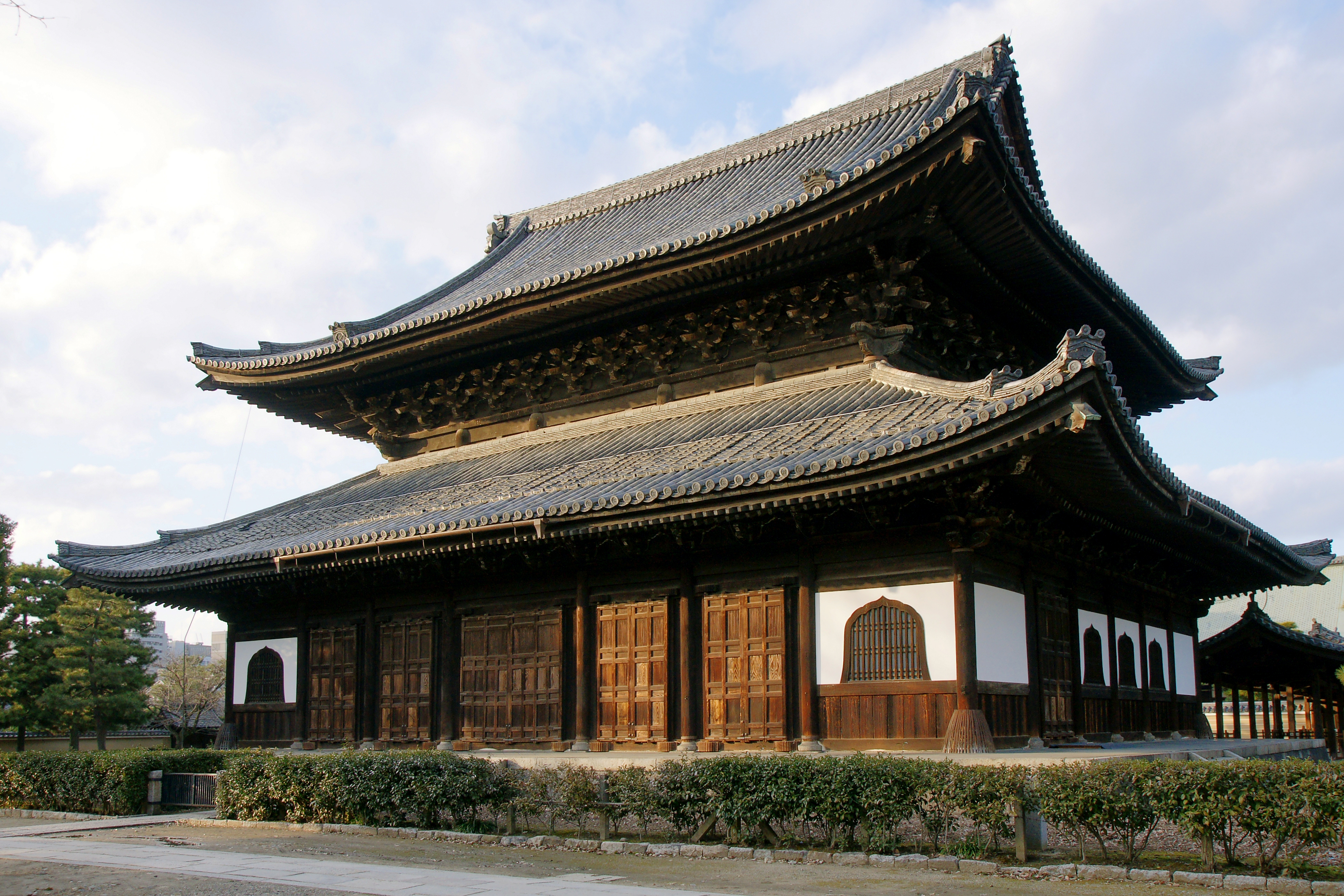
Kennin-ji's hattō

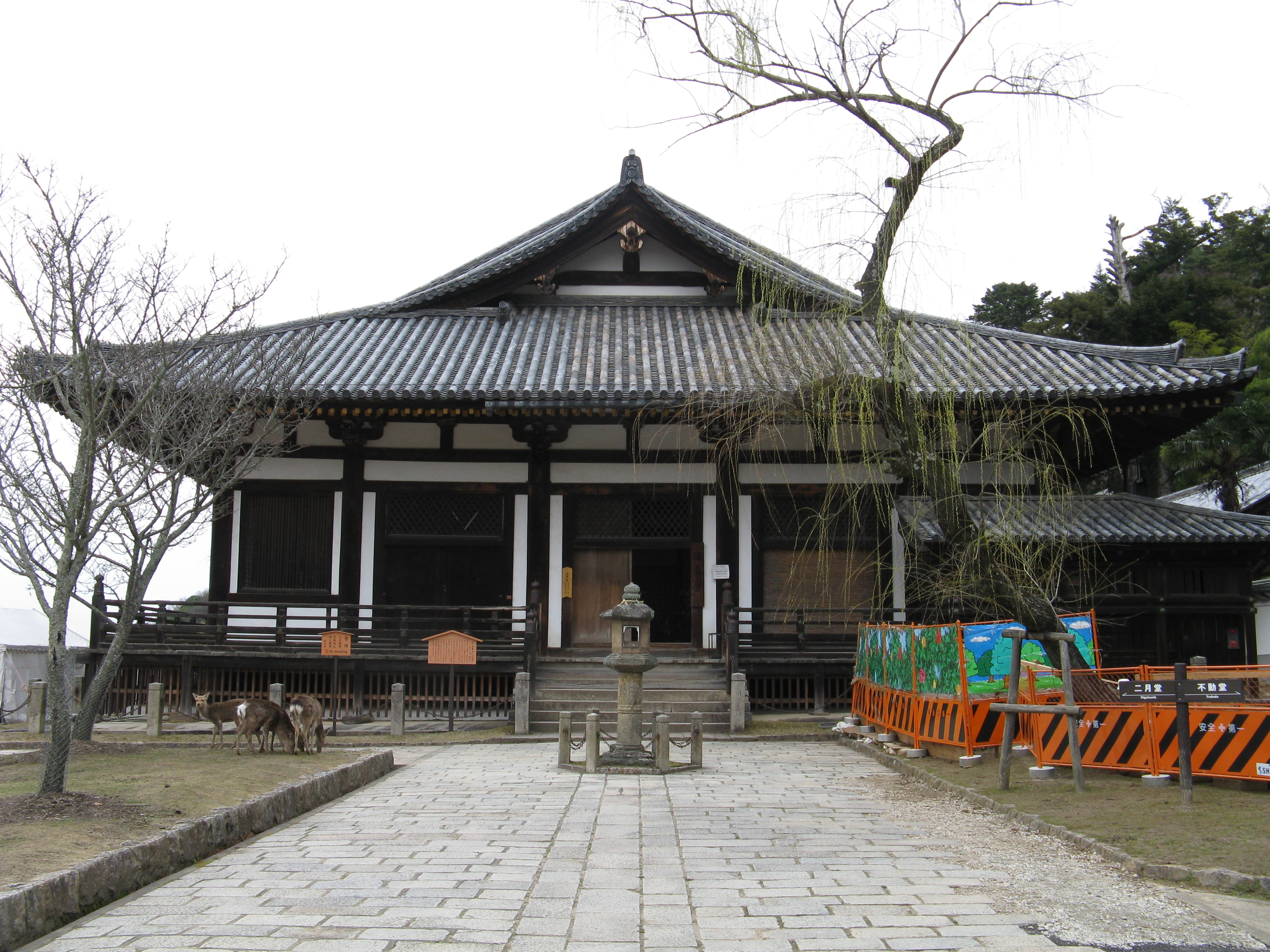
Tōdai-ji's Hokke-dō

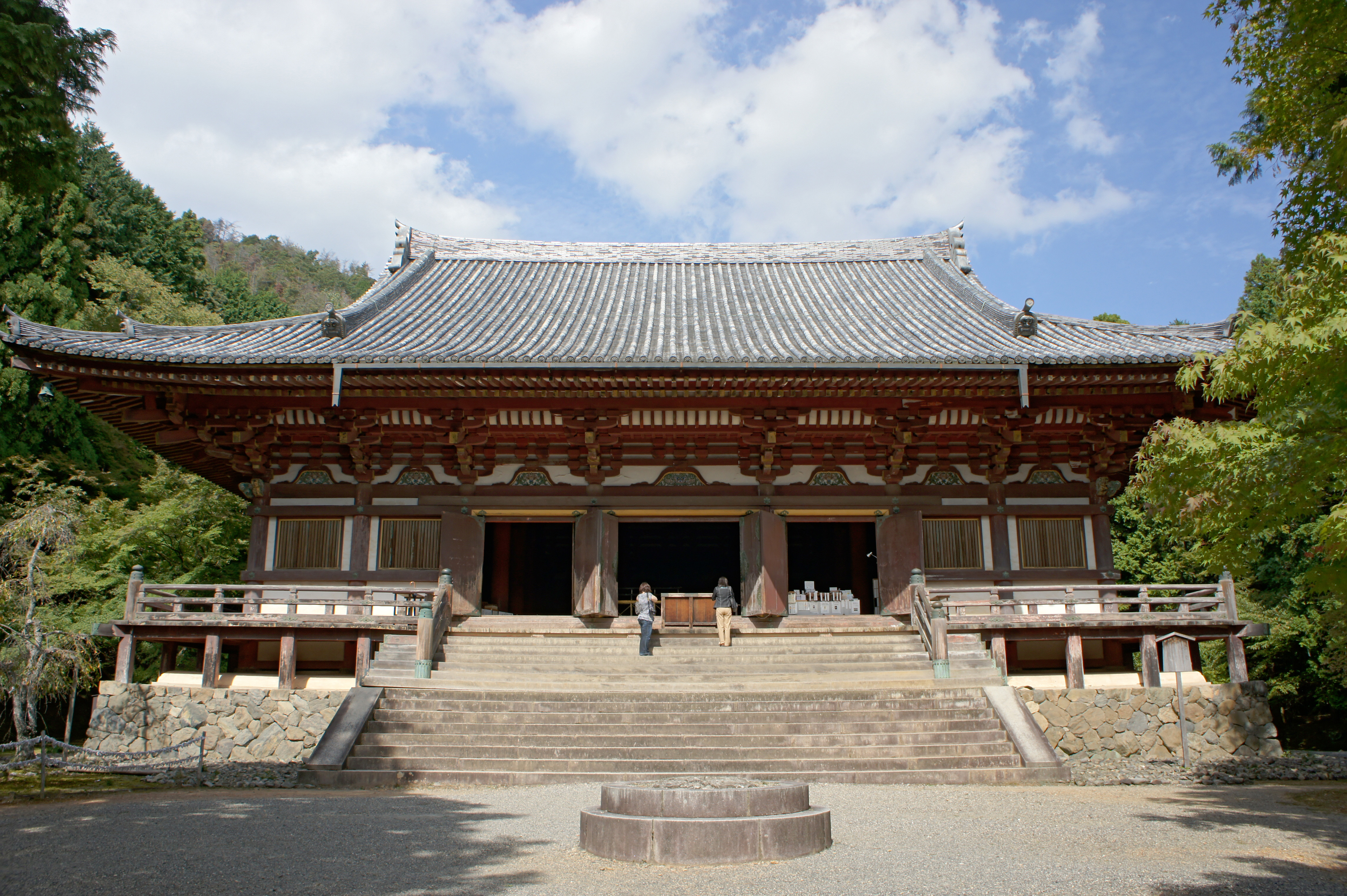
Jingo-ji's honbō

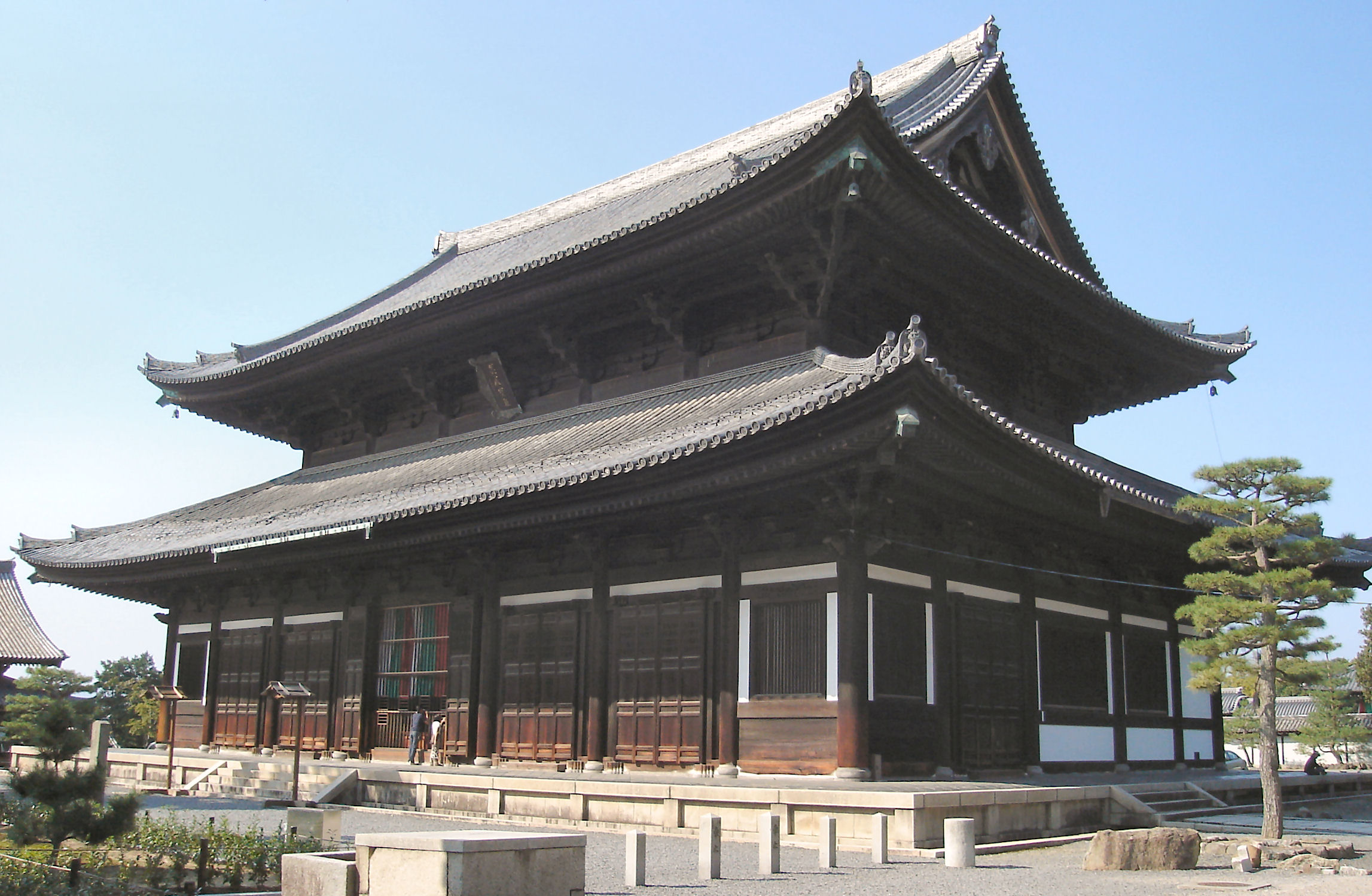
Tōfuku-ji's hon-dō

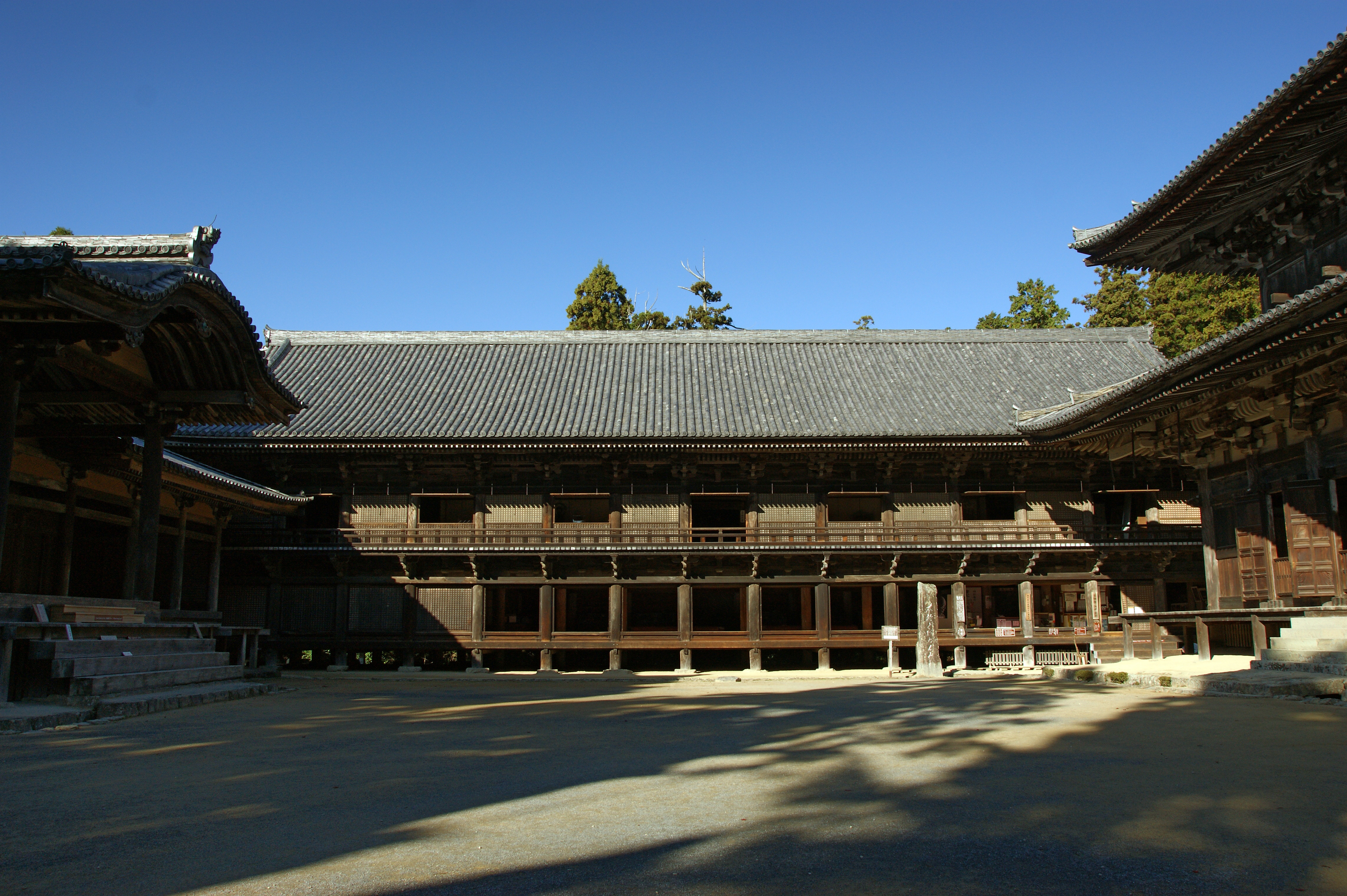
Engyō-ji's jiki-dō

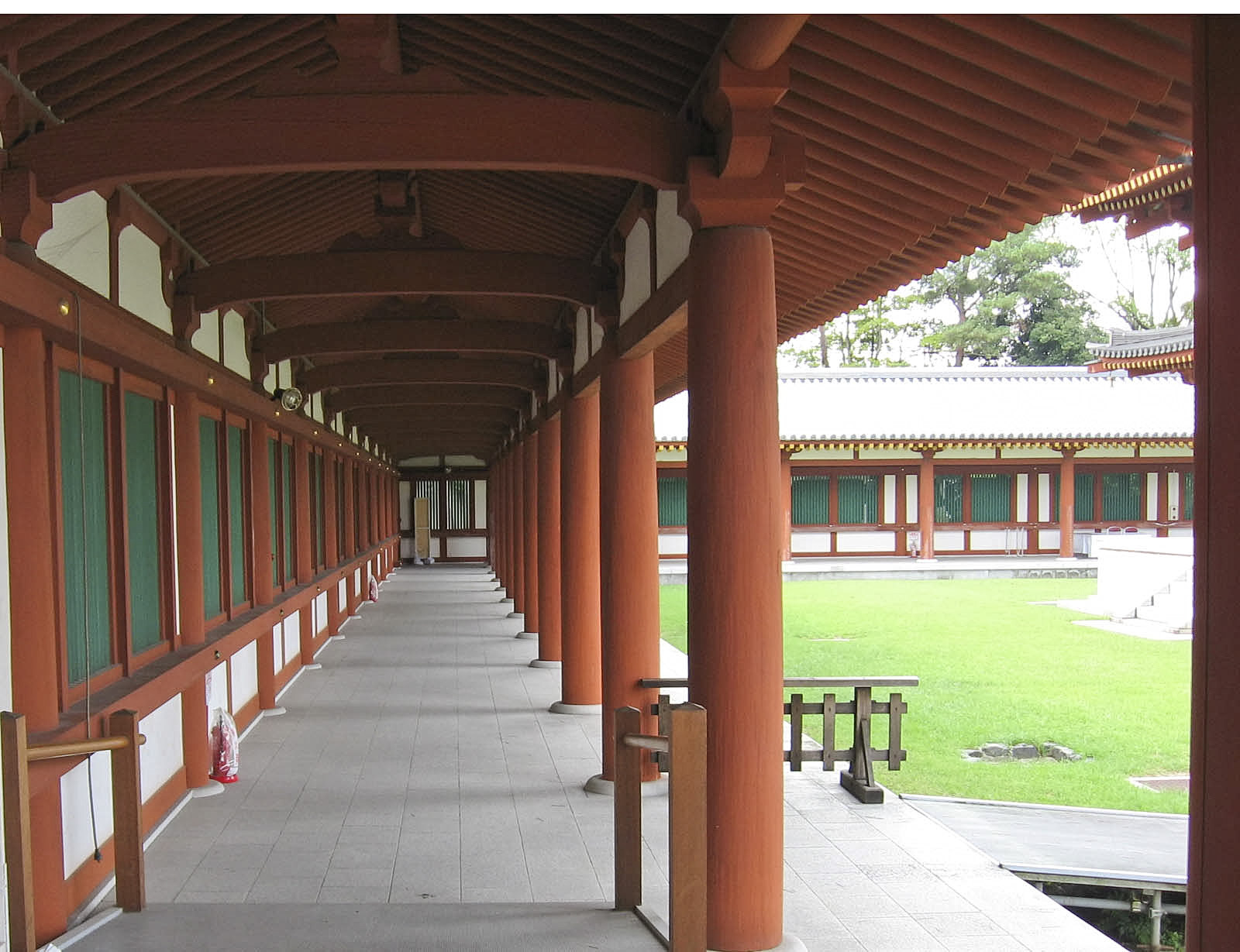
Yakushi-ji's kairō

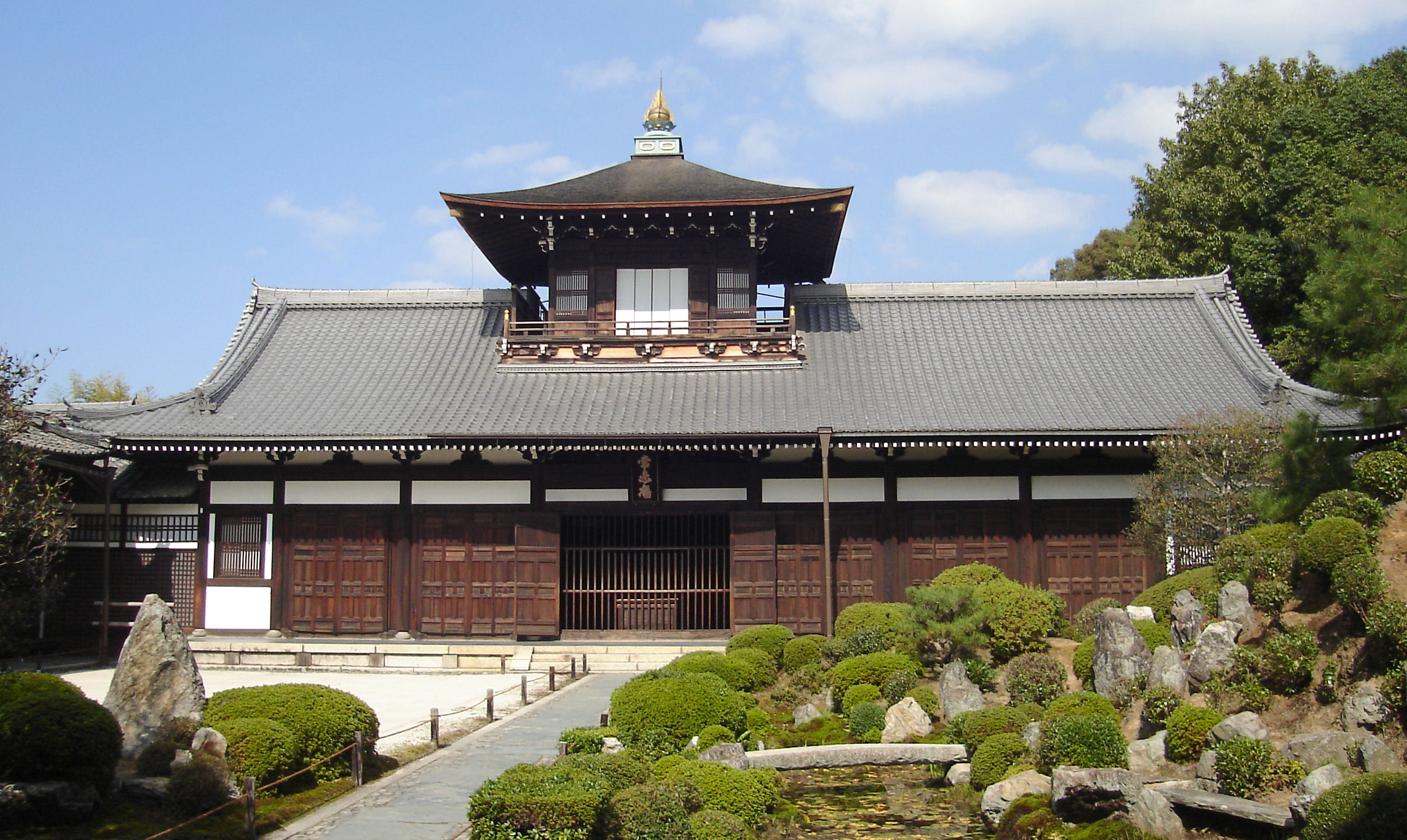
Tōfuku-ji's kaisan-dō

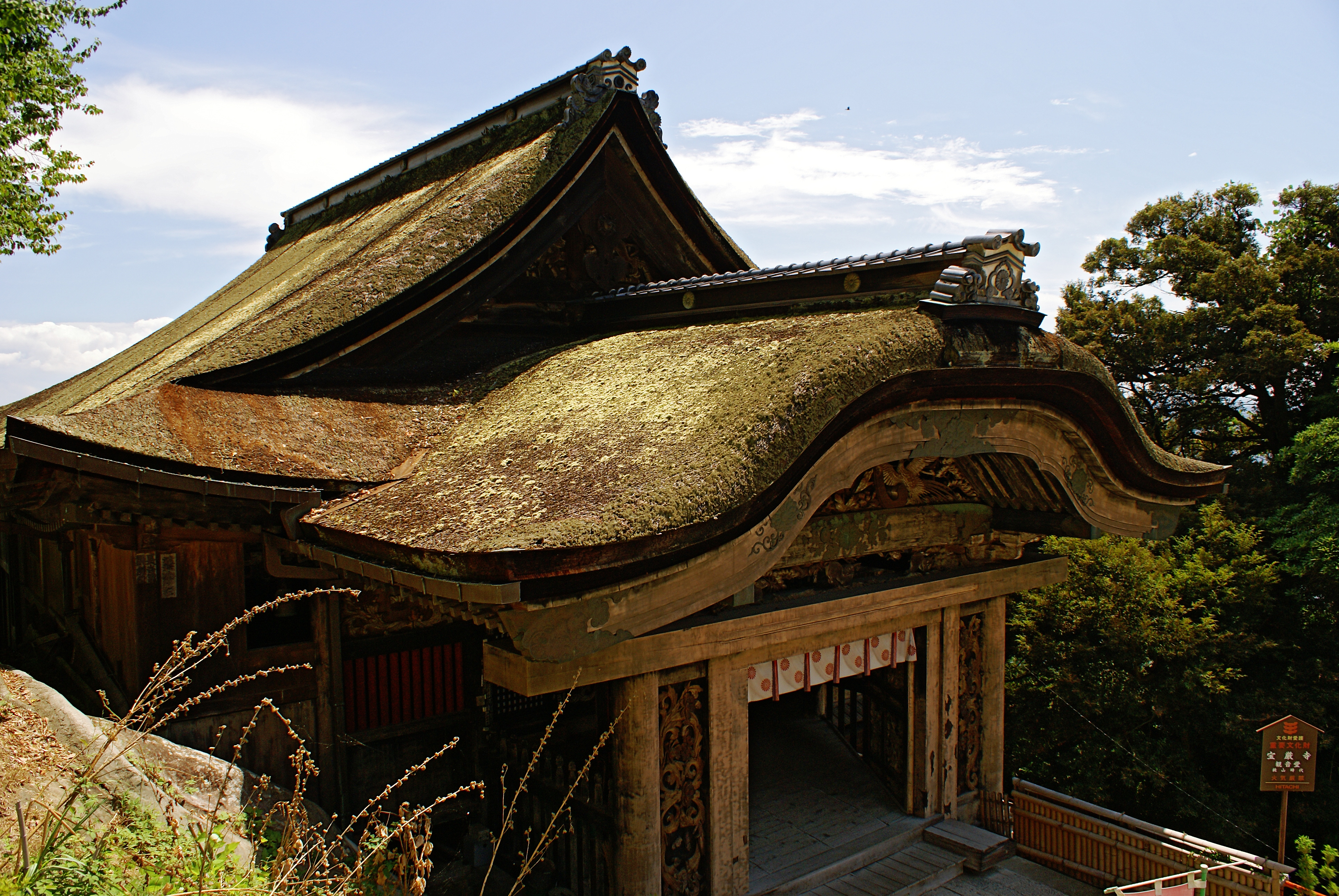
Hōgon-ji's karamon

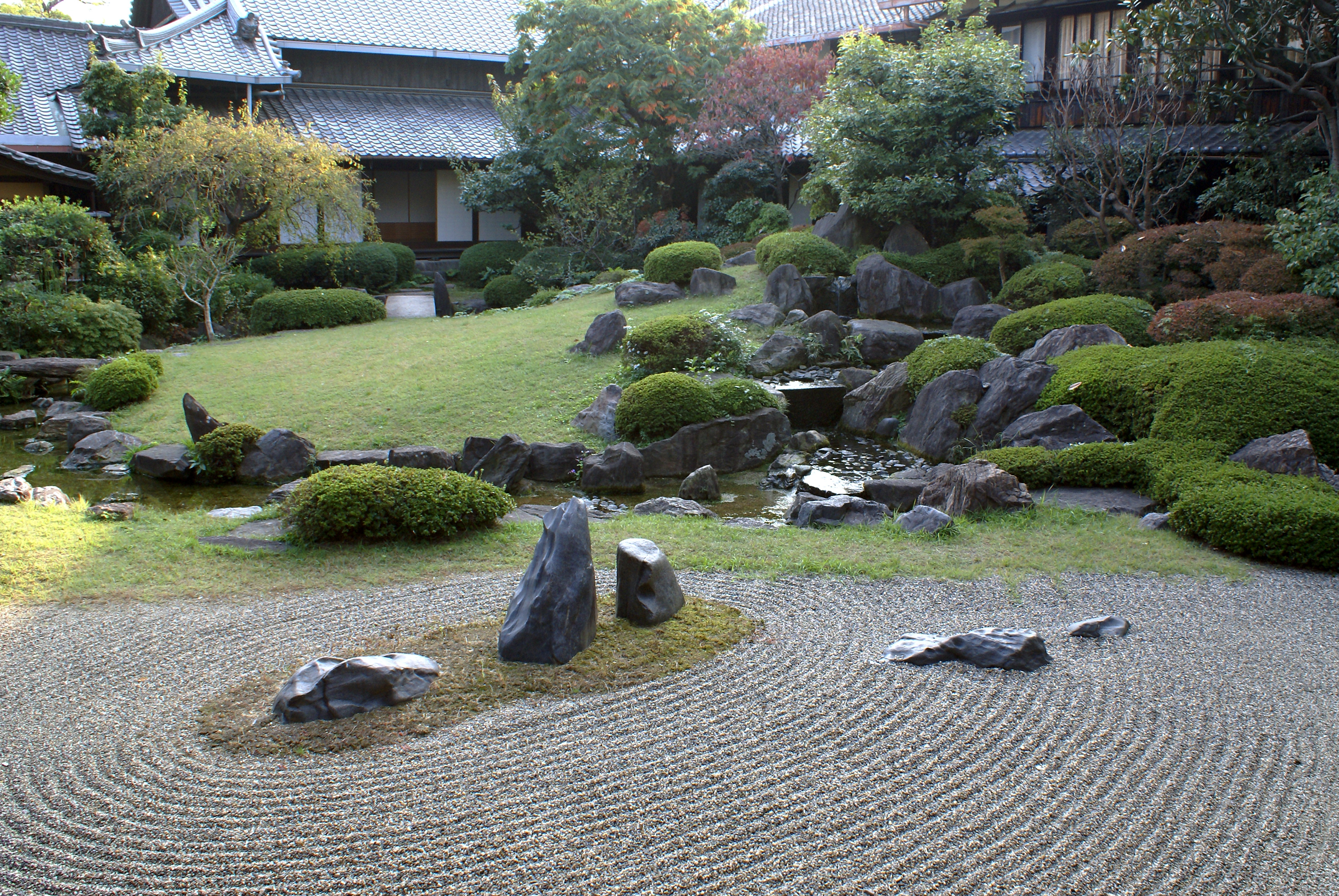
Shitennō-ji's karesansui

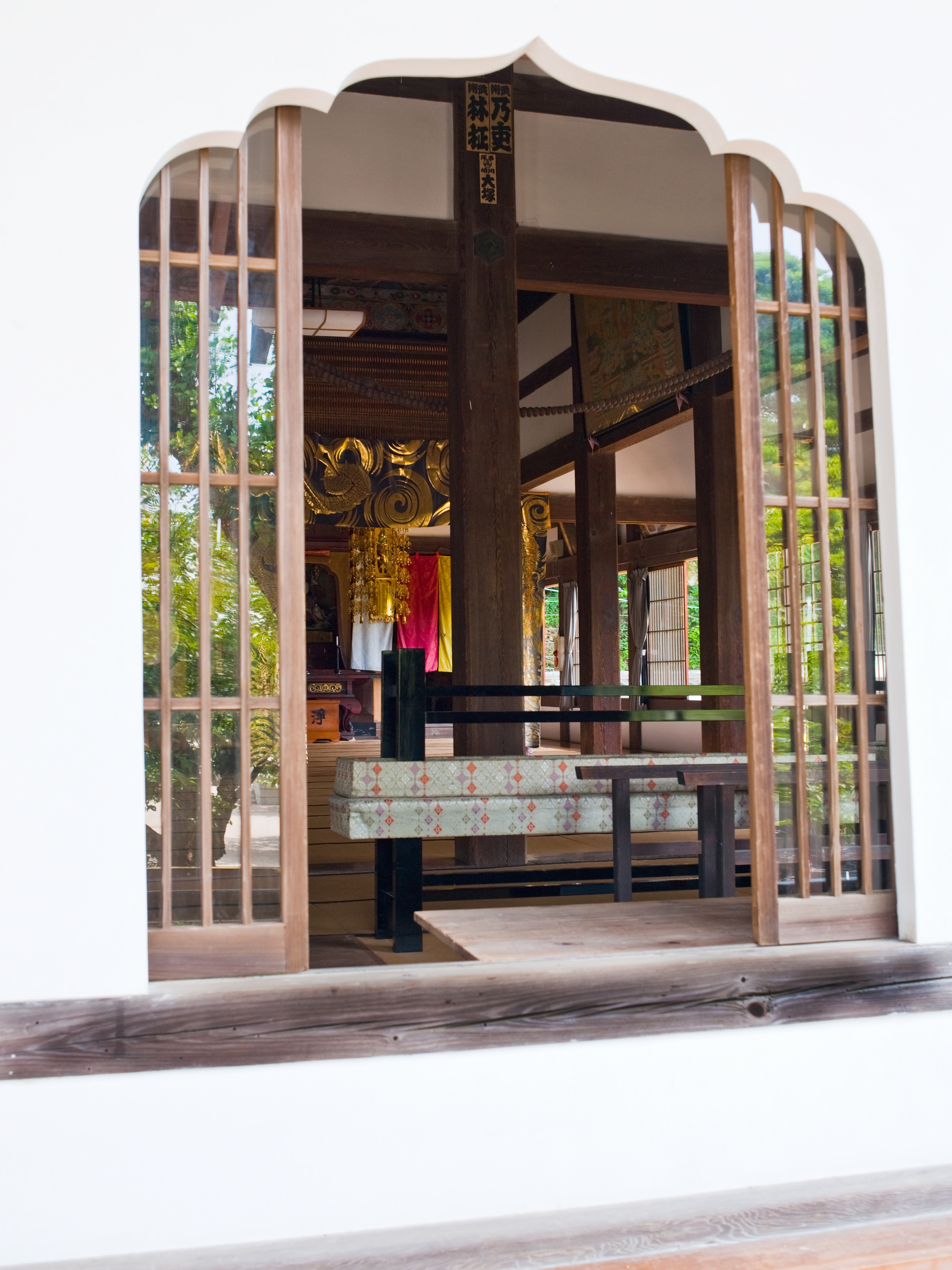
A katōmado

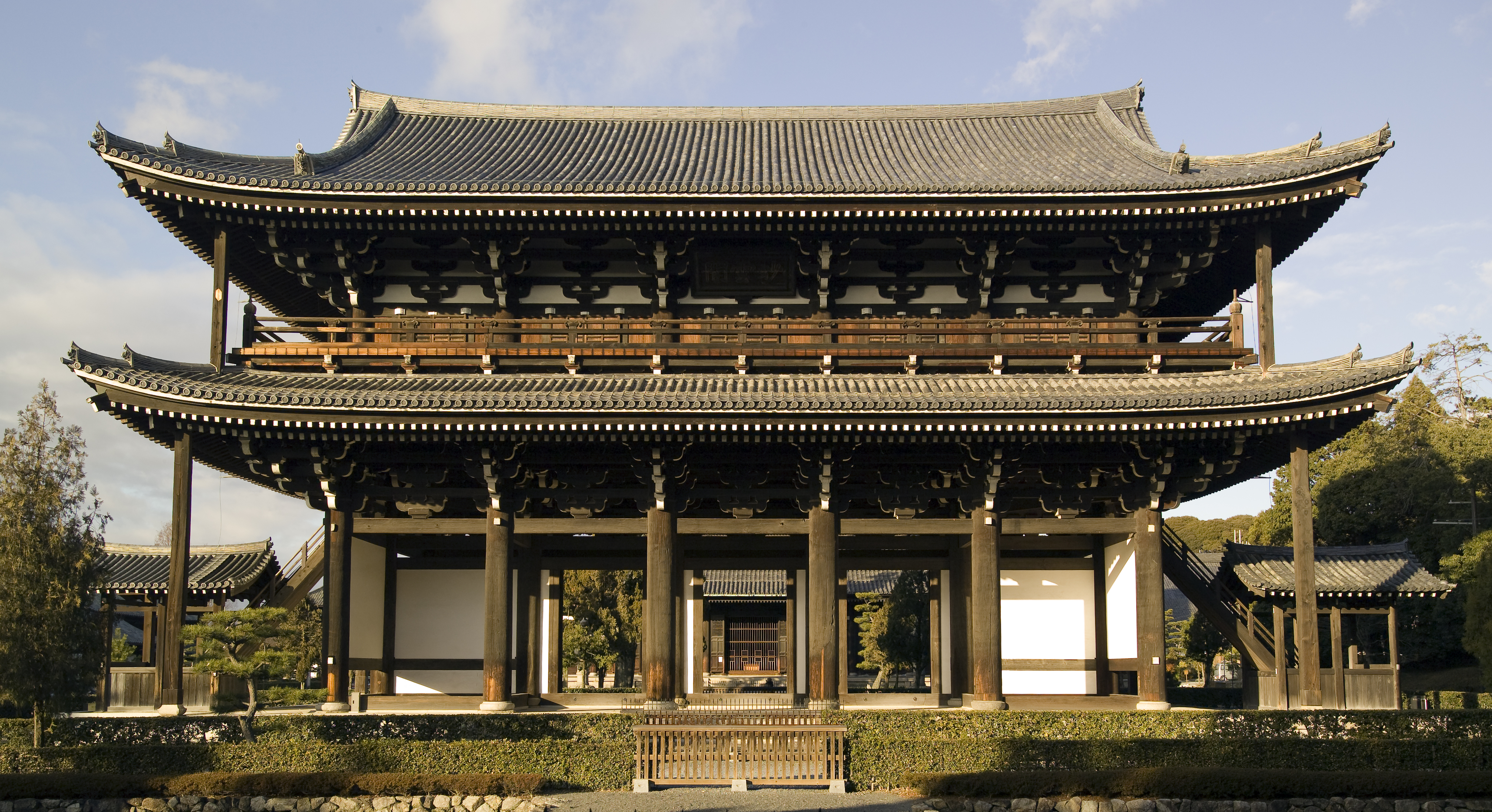
Tōfuku-ji's sanmon is 5 ken wide.

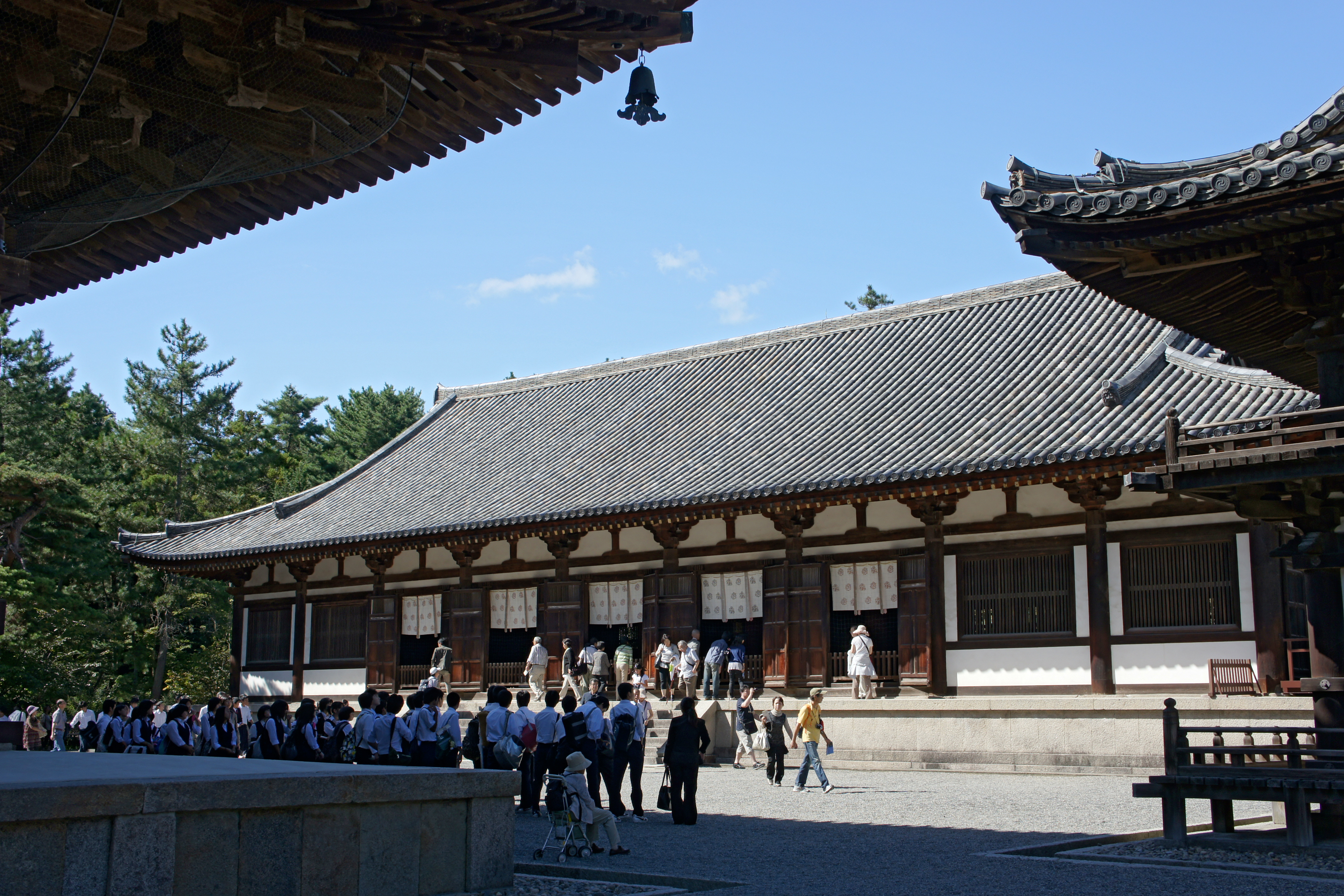
Kō-dō at Tōshōdai-ji

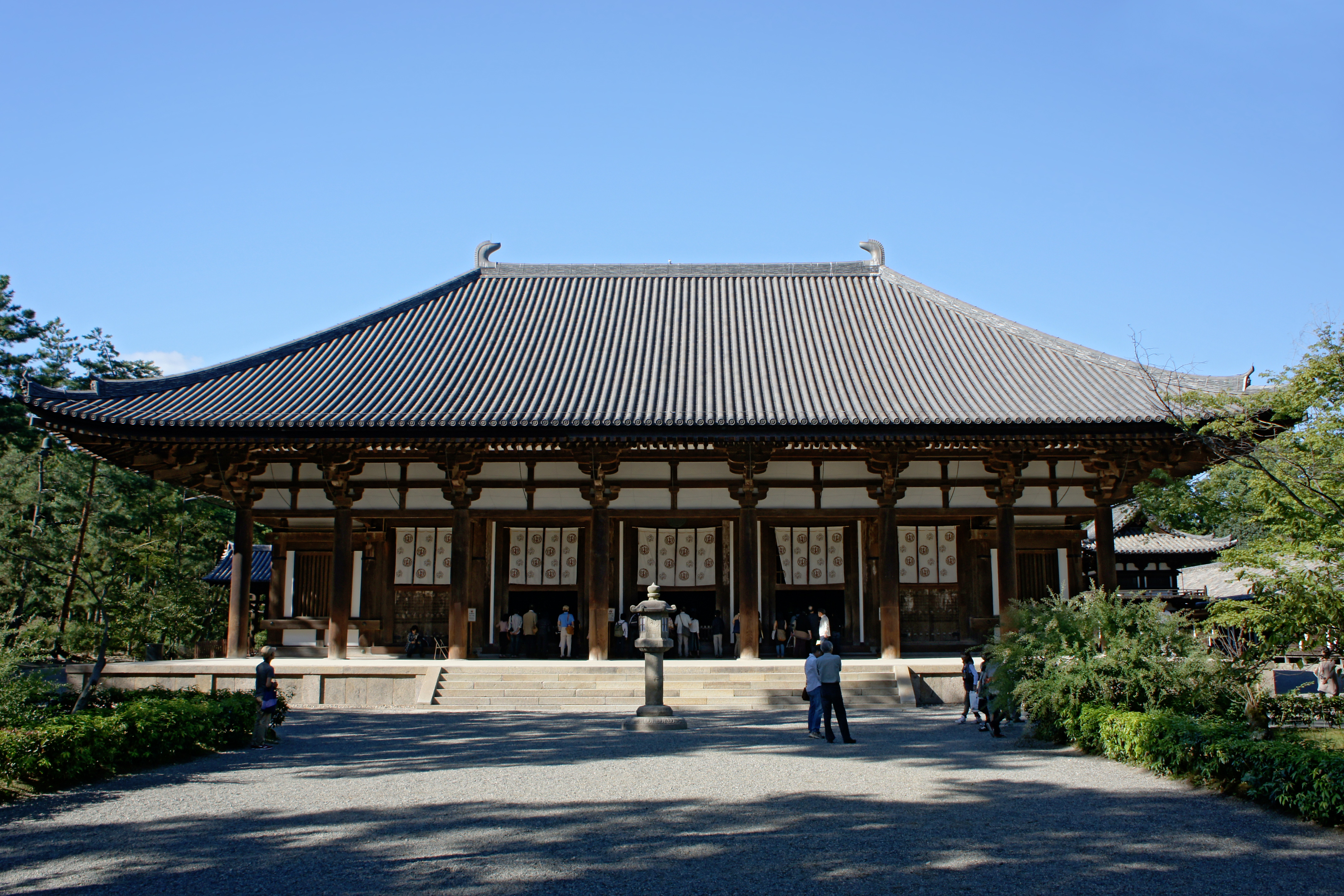
Kon-dō at Tōshōdai-ji

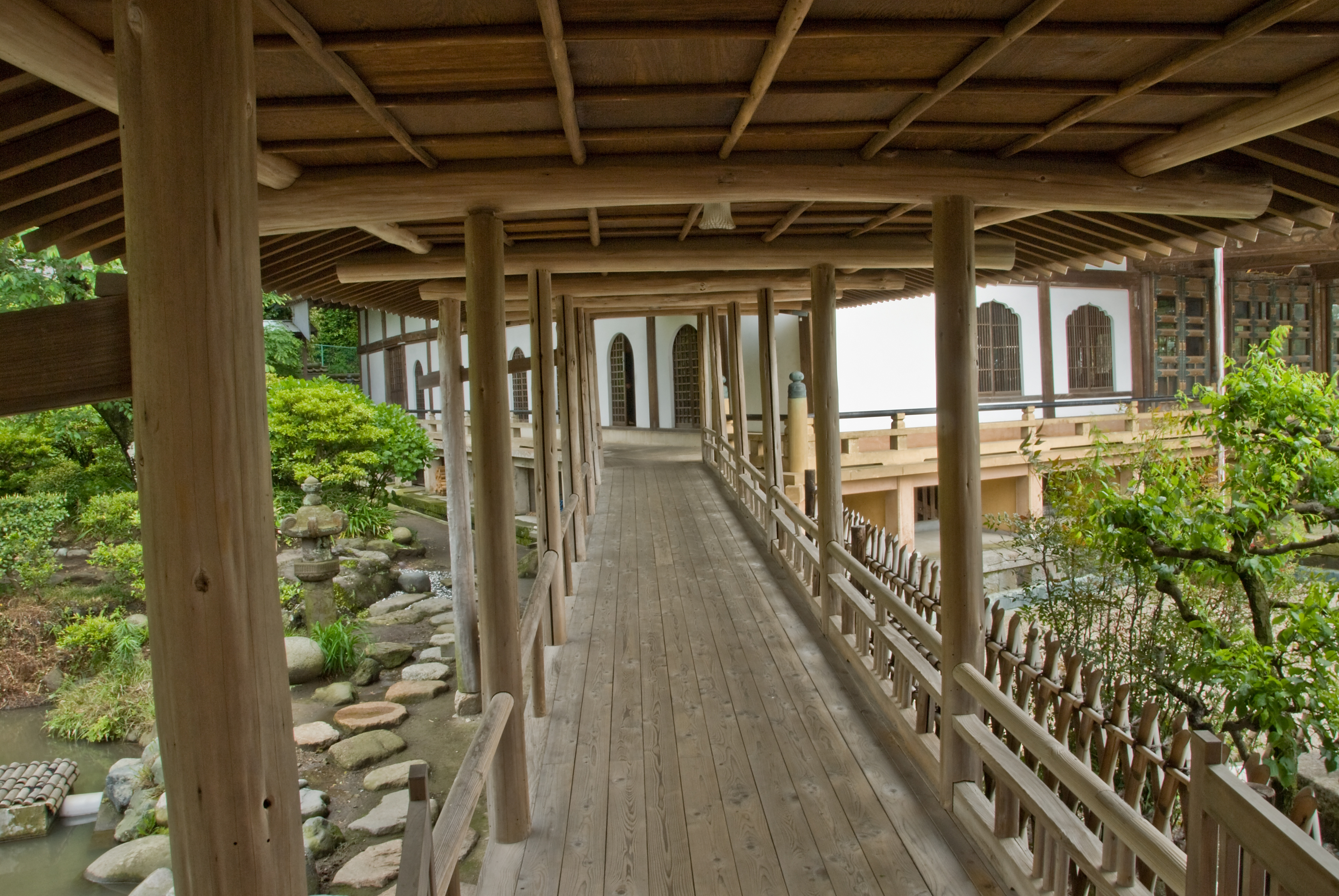
A konrō

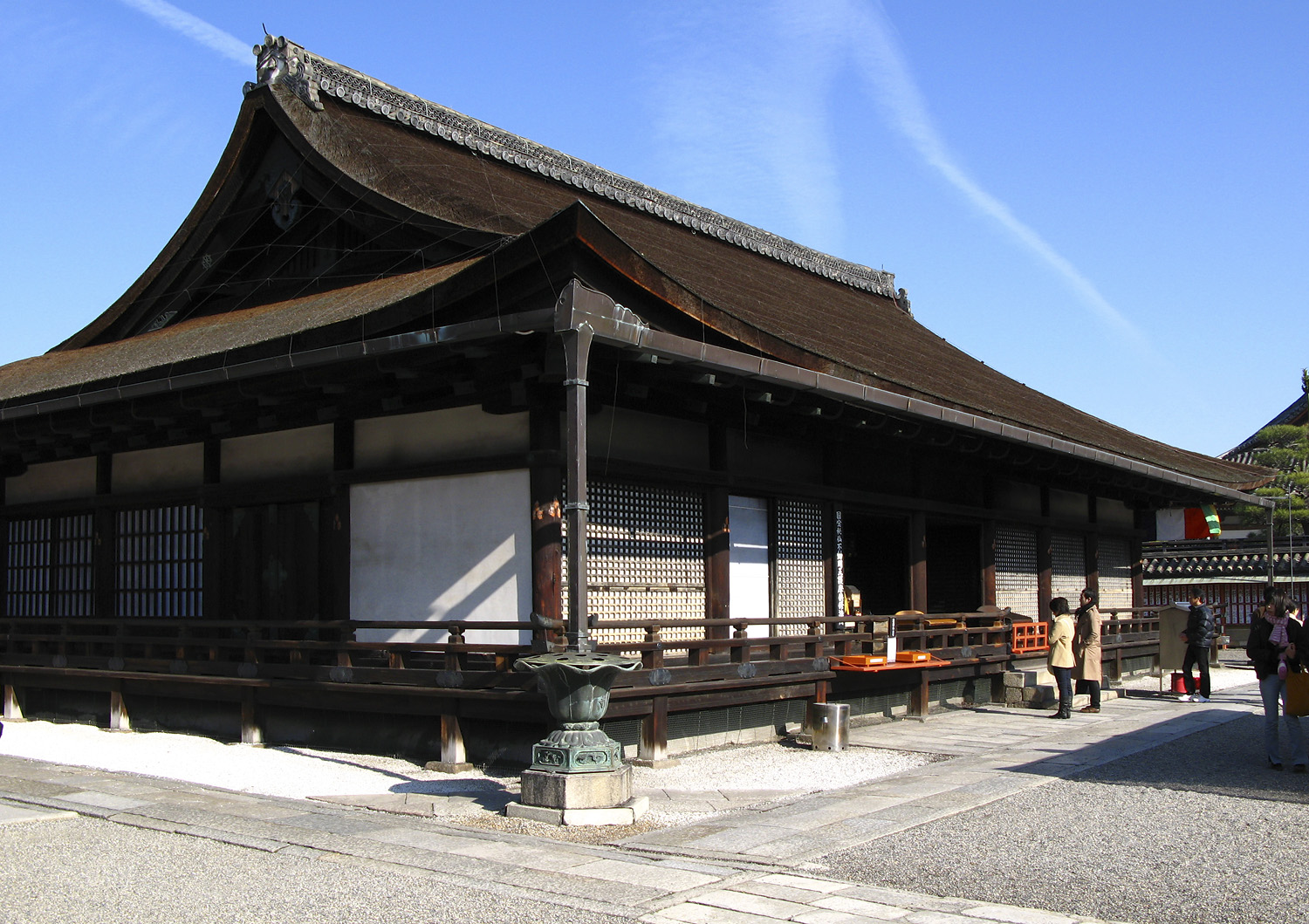
Miei-dō at Tō-ji

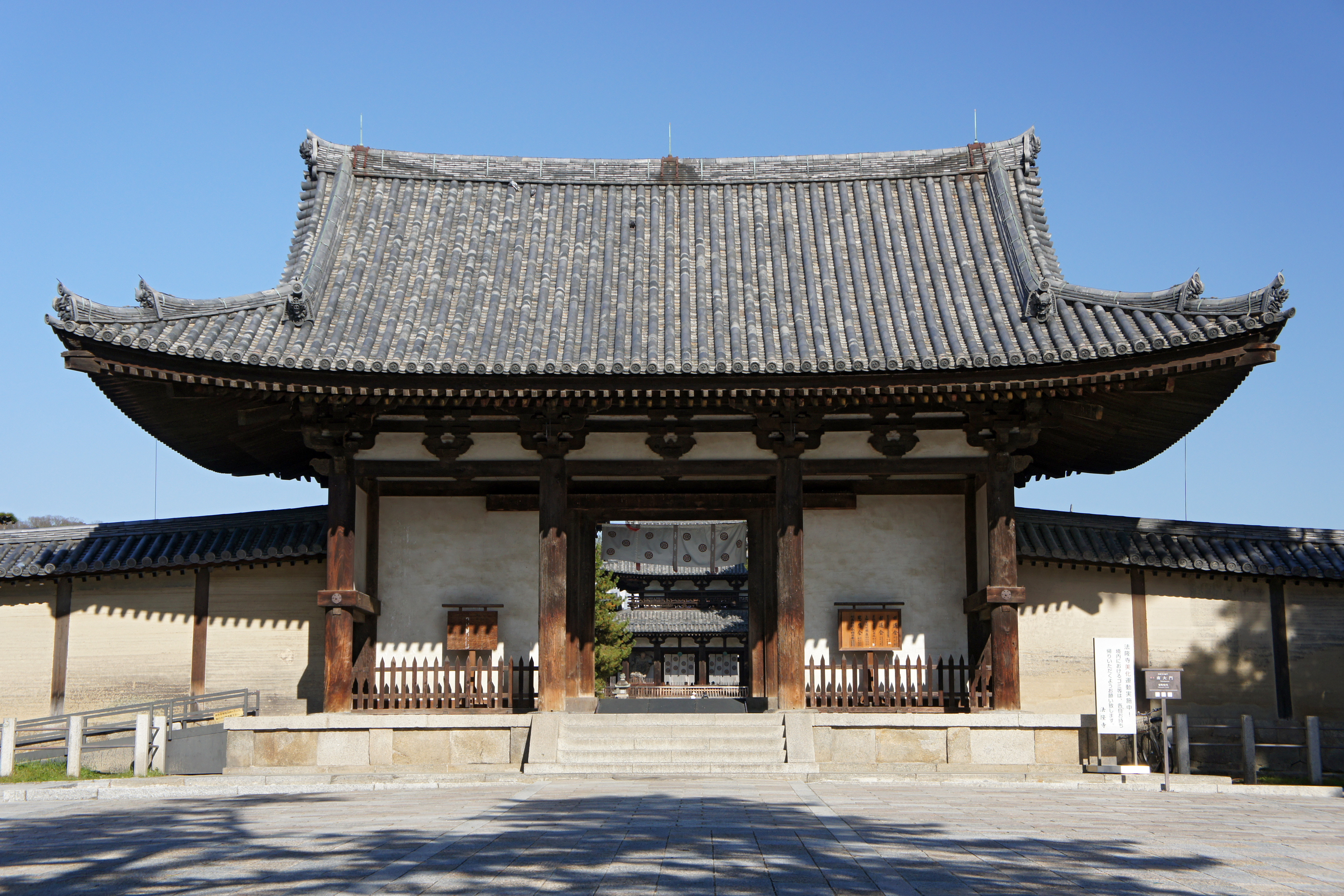
Nandaimon at Hōryū-ji

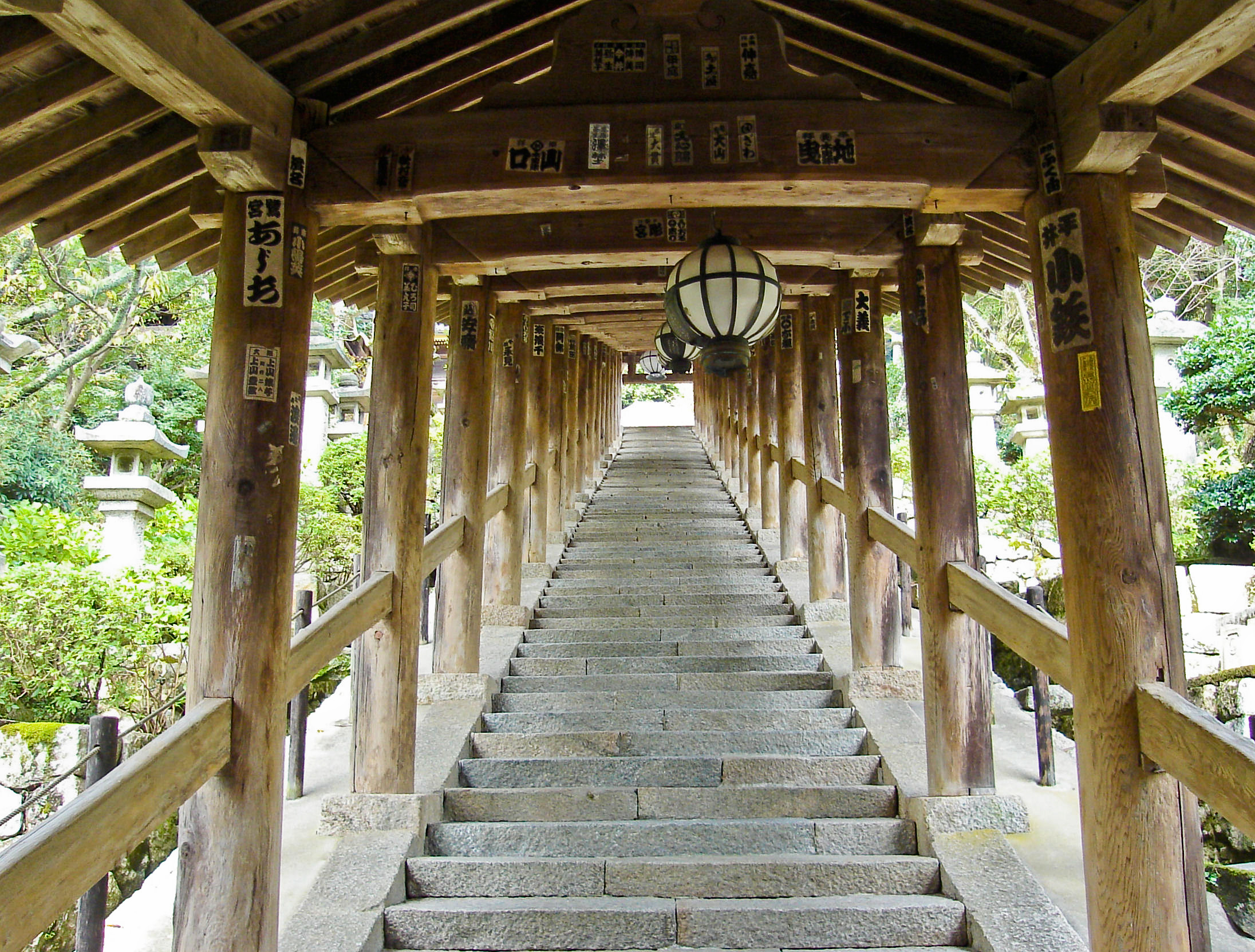
The noborirō at Nara's Hase-dera

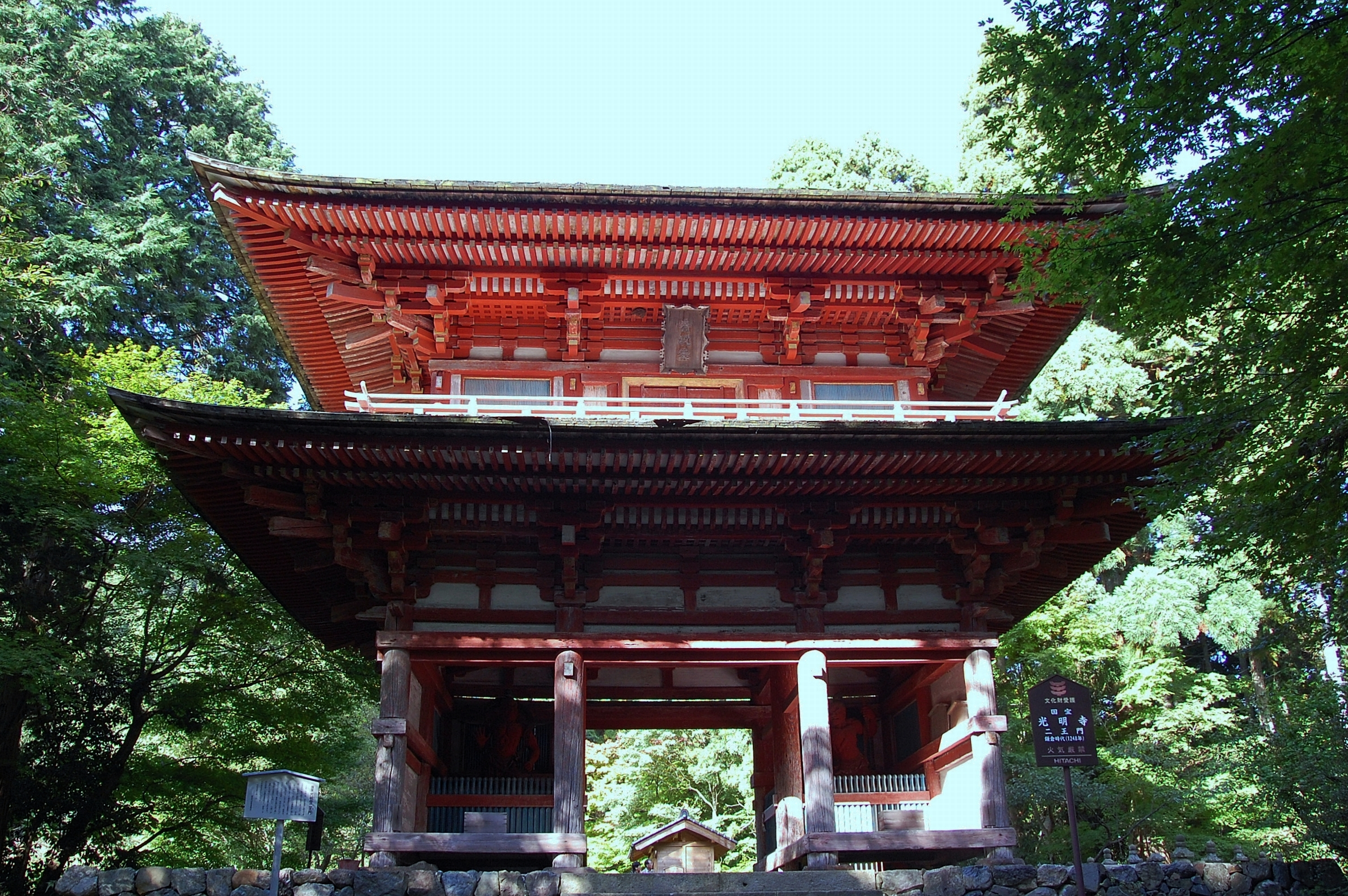
Nijūmon at Kōmyō-ji in Ayabe.

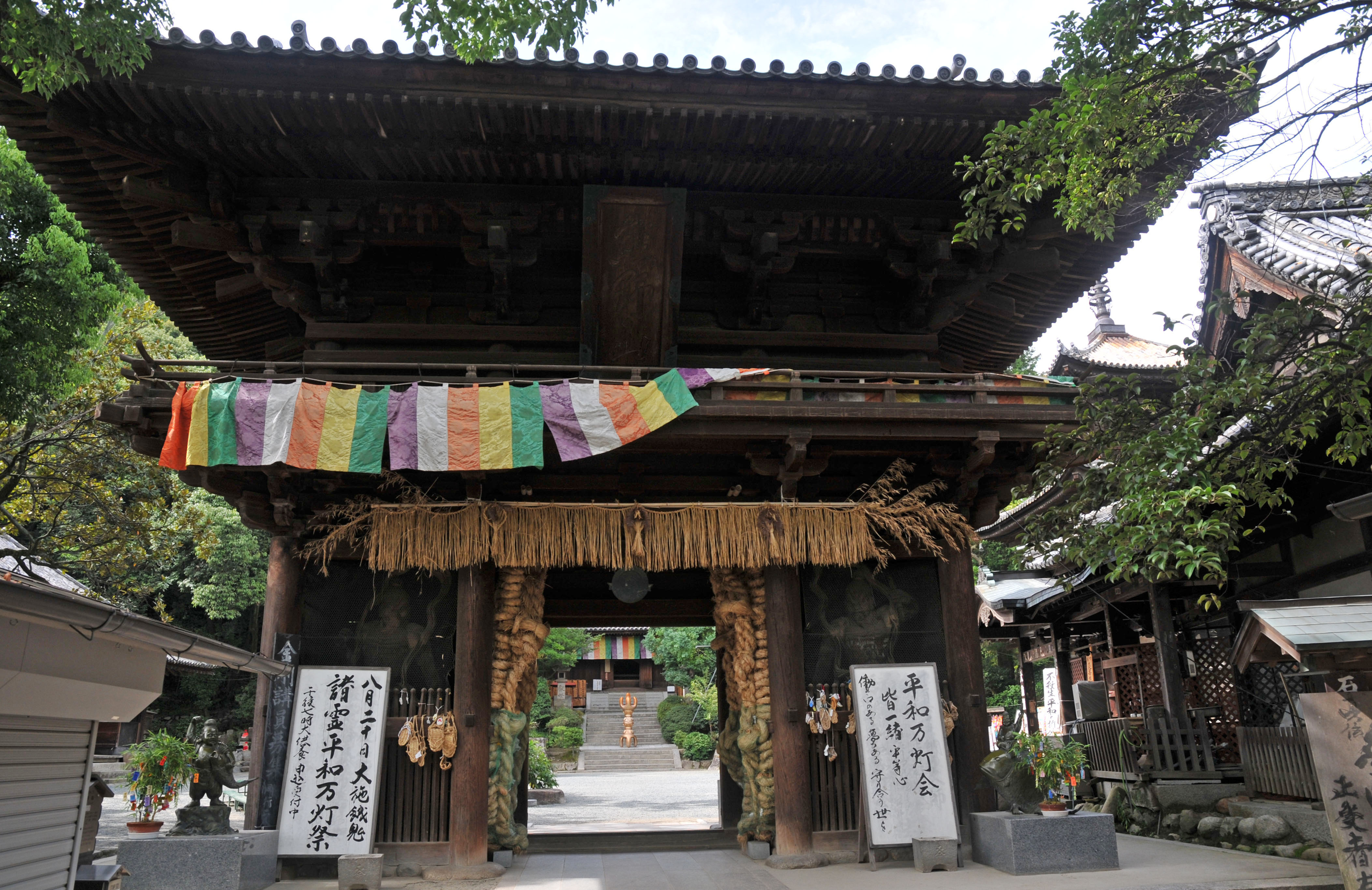
Ishite-ji's niōmon

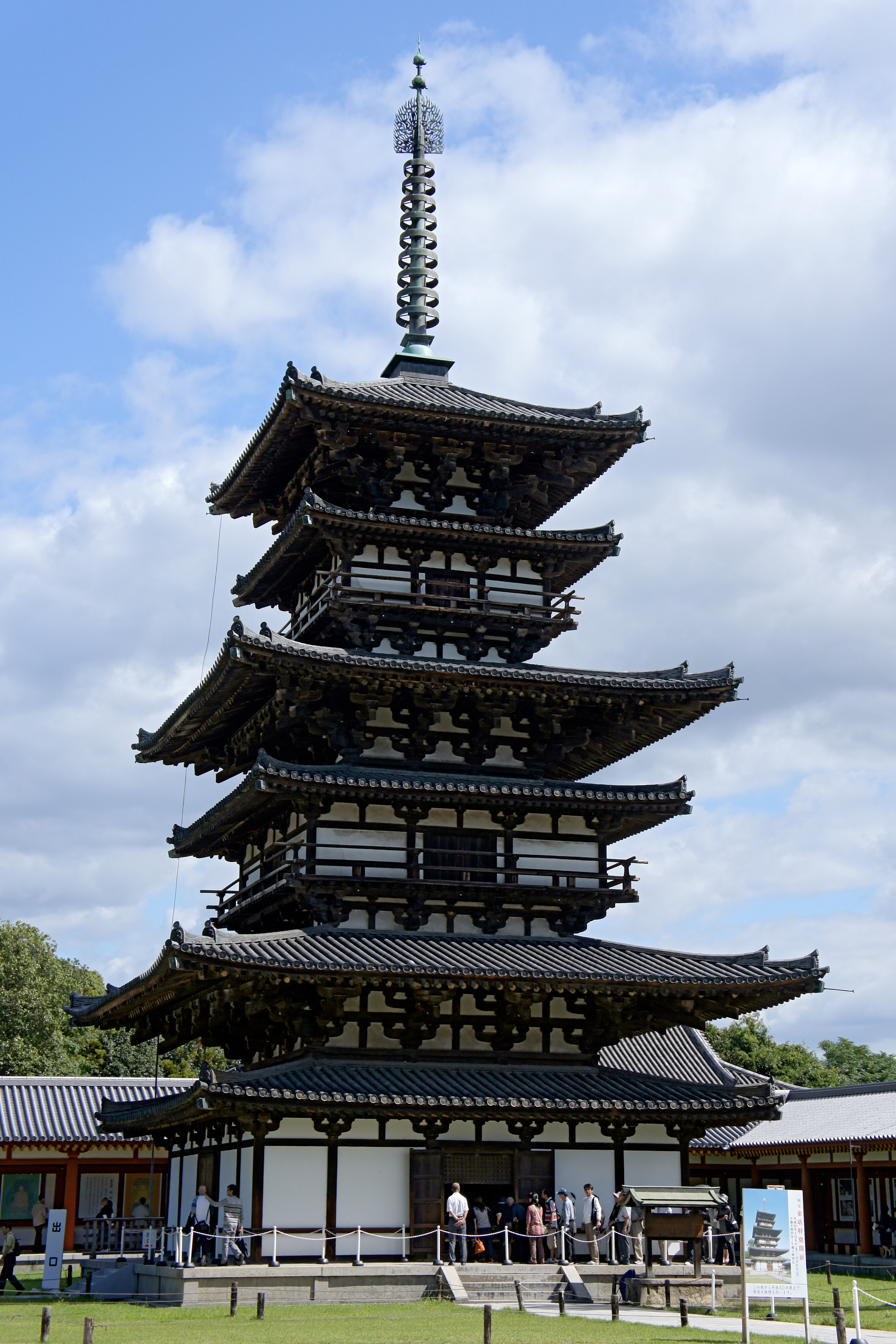
(East) Pagoda at Yakushi-ji in Nara

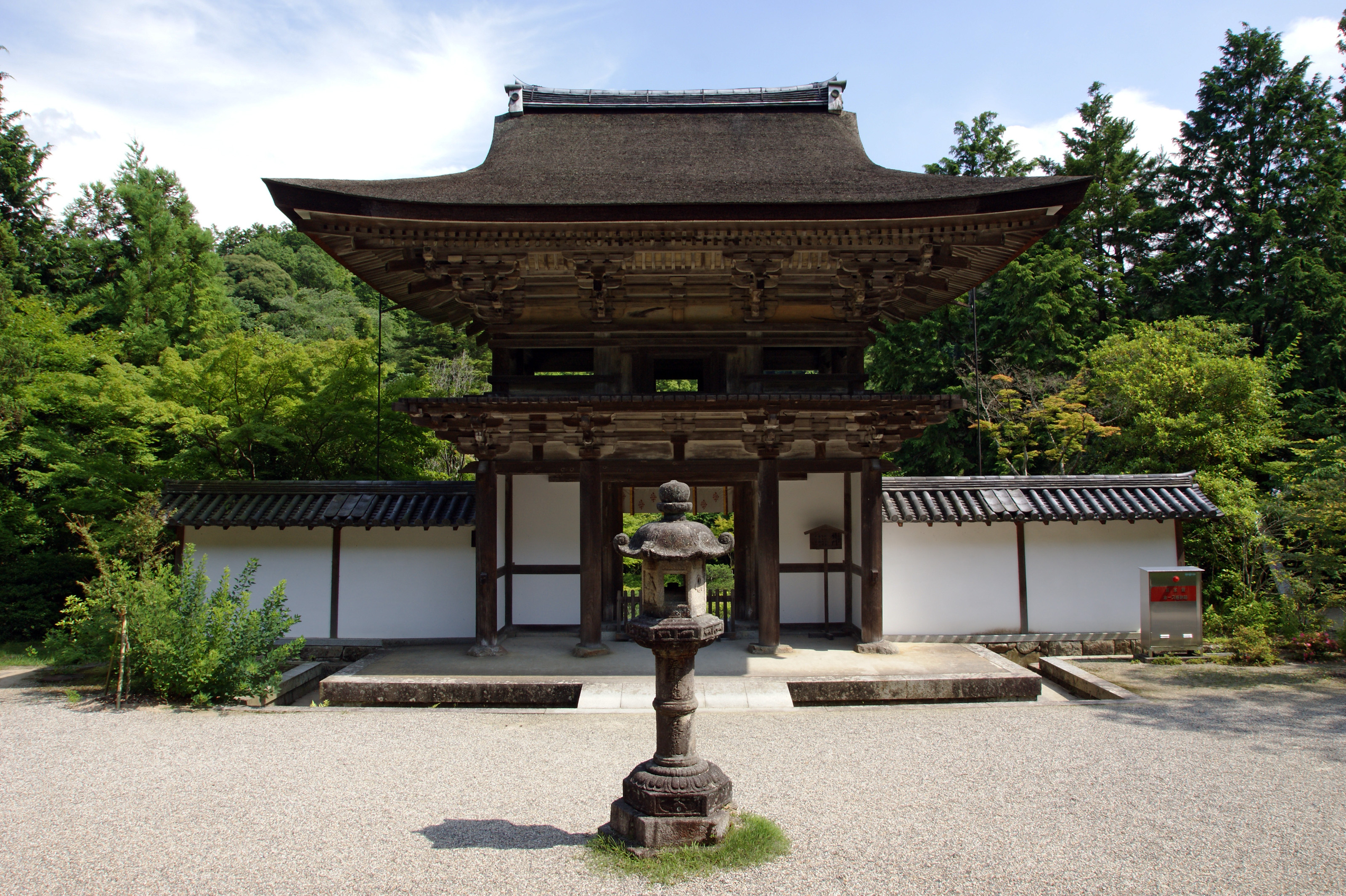
Enjō-ji's rōmon

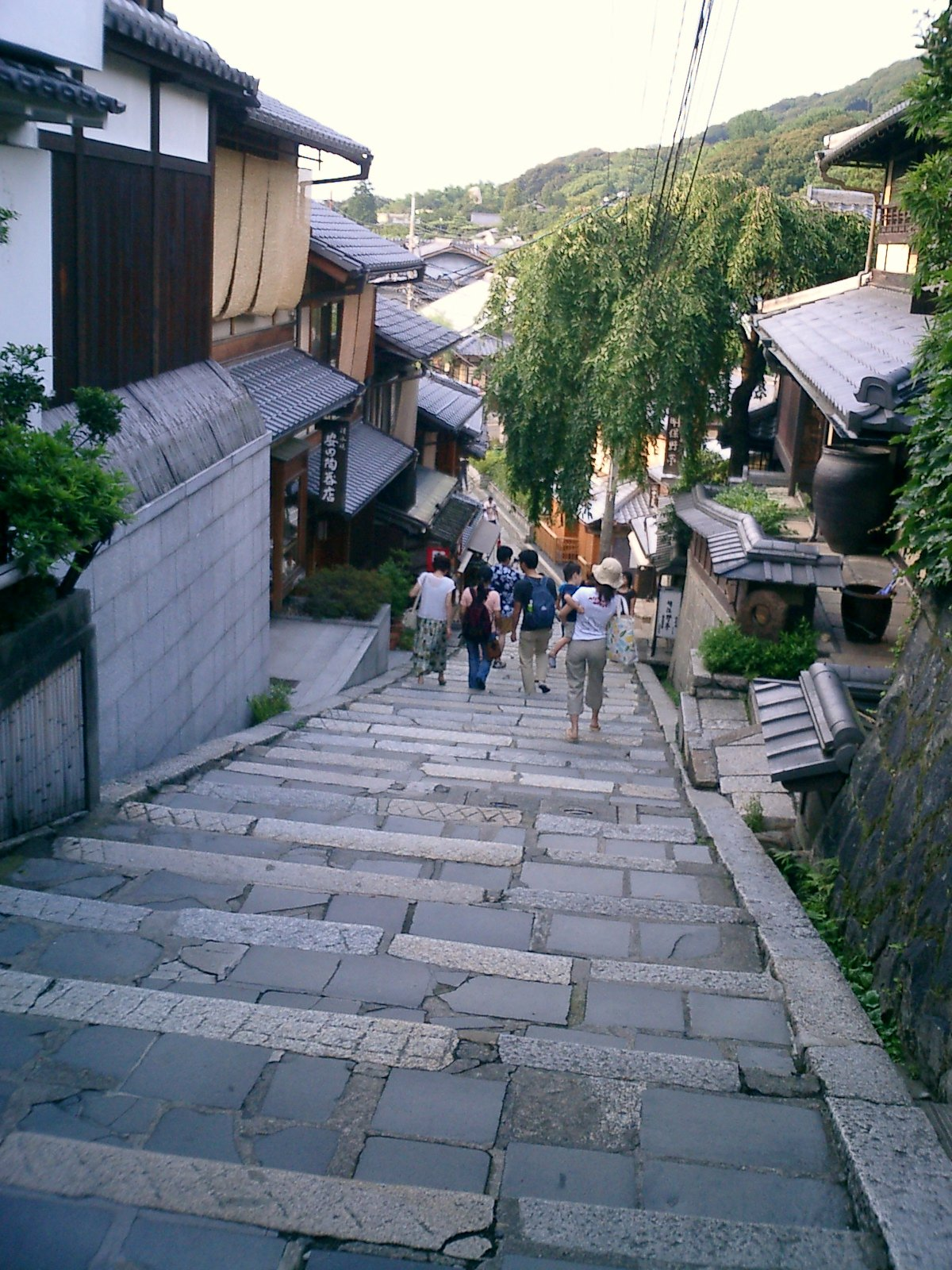
Kiyomizu-dera's sandō

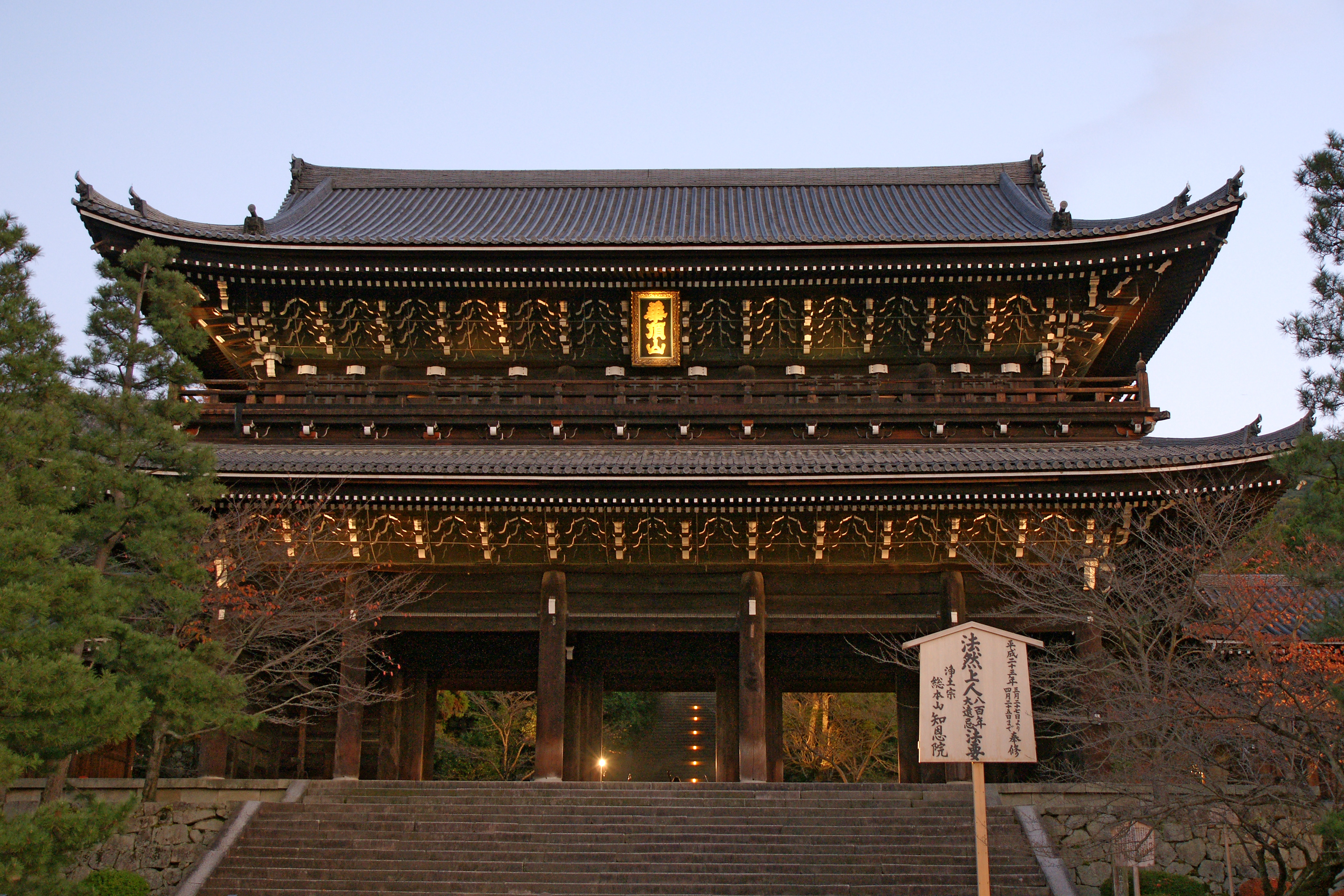
A high rank, five-bay sanmon at Chion-in. Note the sanrō.

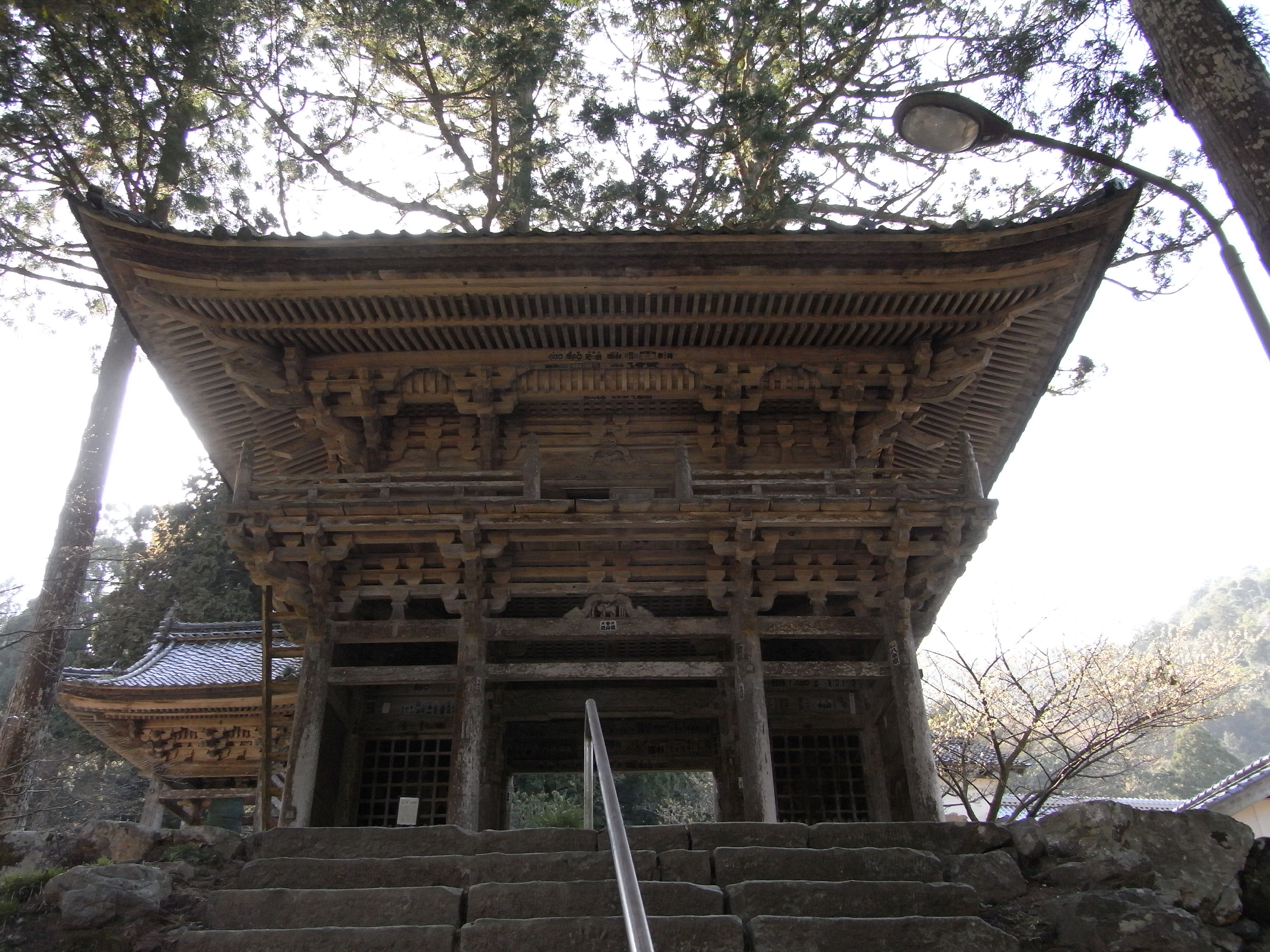
A middle rank, three-bay sanmon at Myōtsū-ji

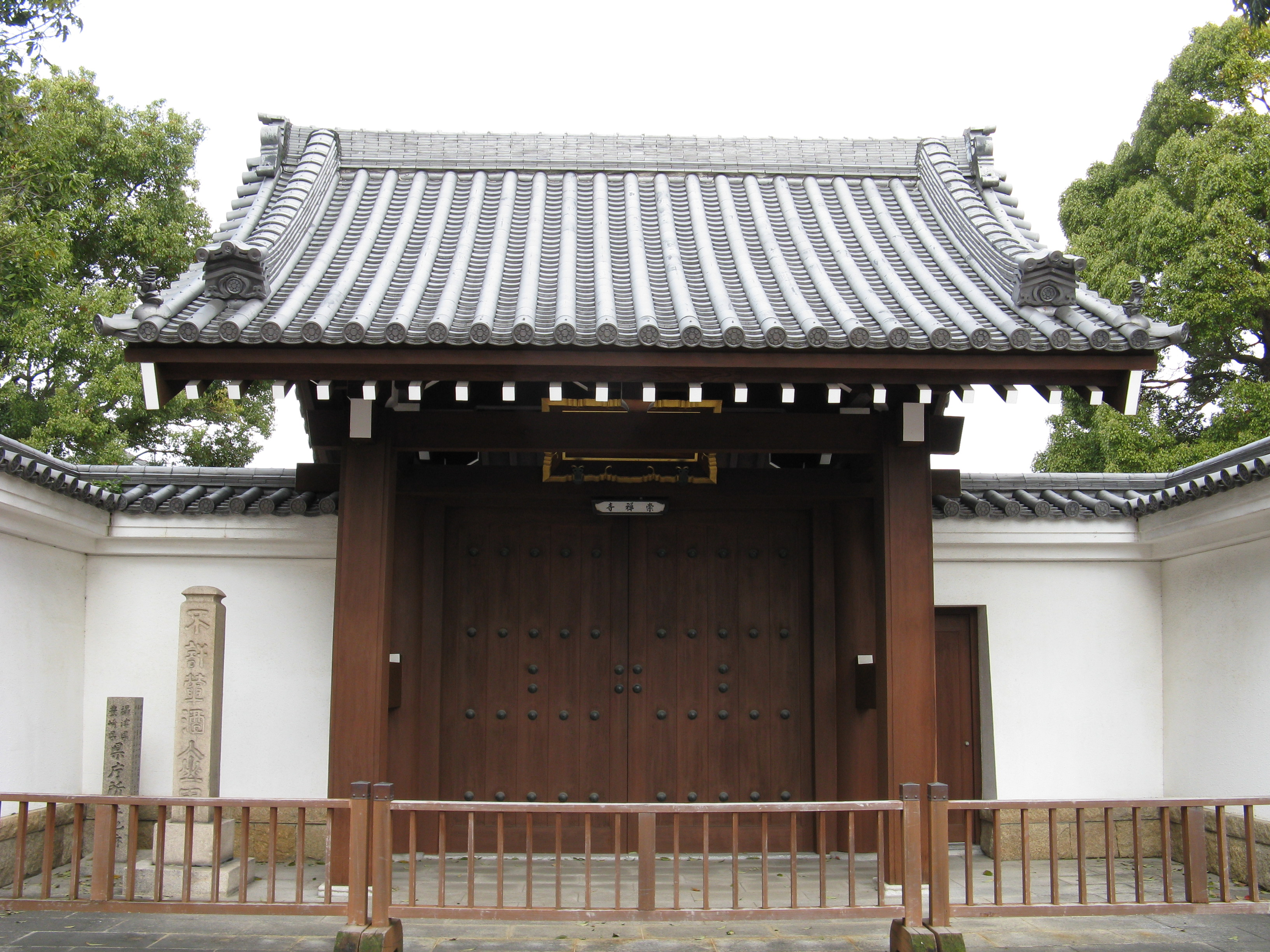
A low rank sanmon at Sozen-ji in Osaka

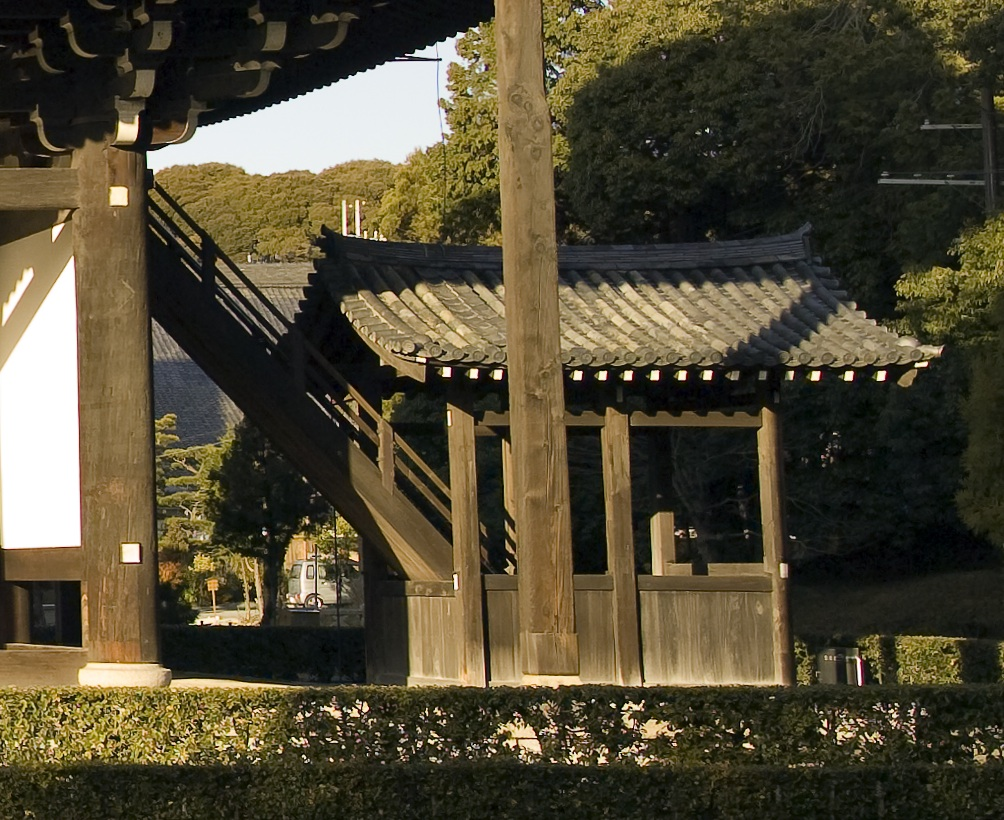
The sanrō of Tōfuku-ji's sanmon. (See also the sanmon's photo above.)

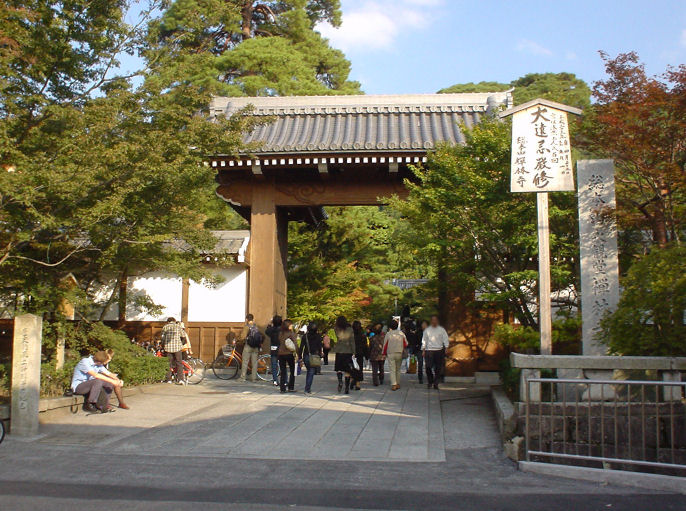
Eikan-dō Zenrin-ji's sōmon

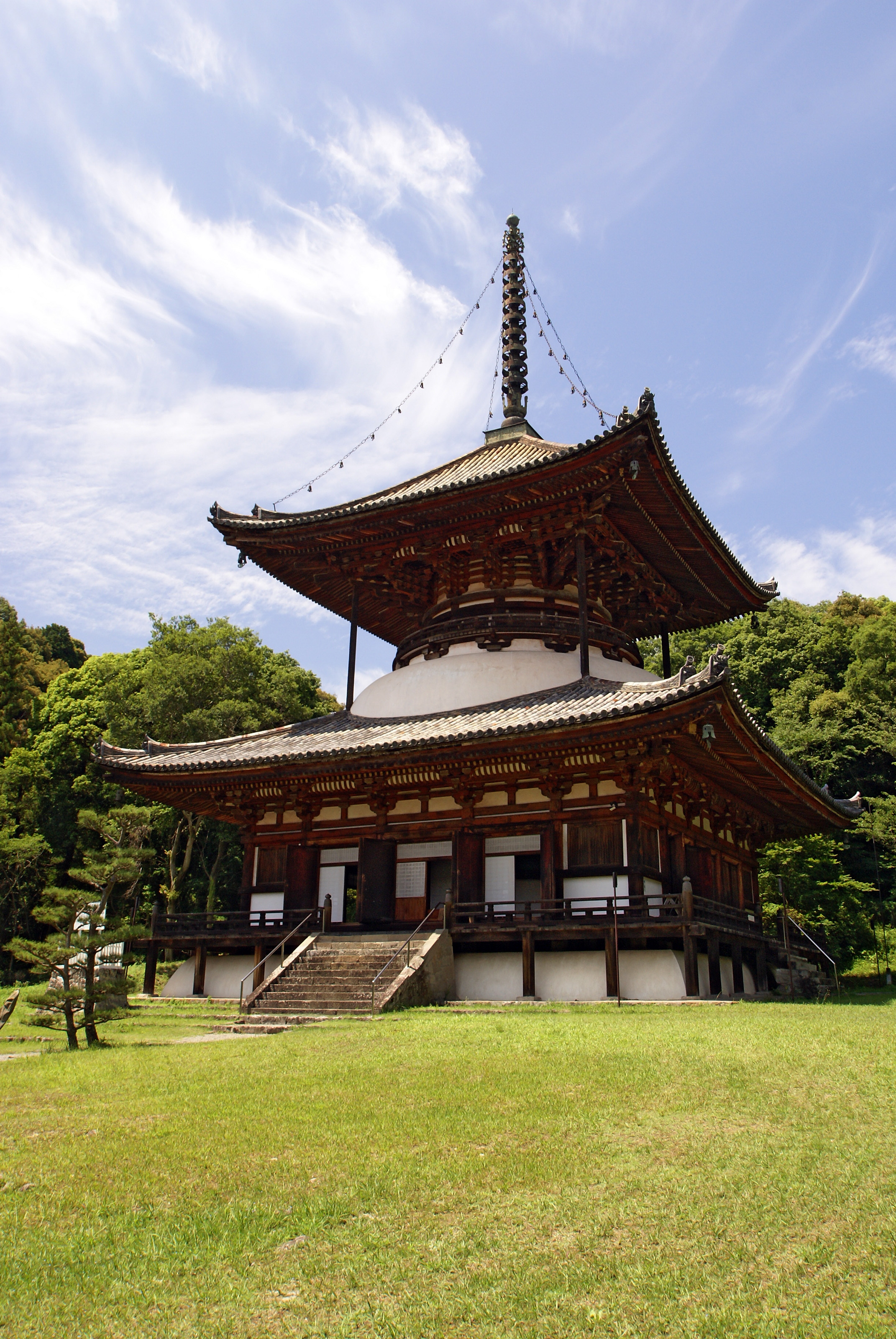
Negoro-ji's large sōrin (metal spire) on top of a daitō (large tahōtō)

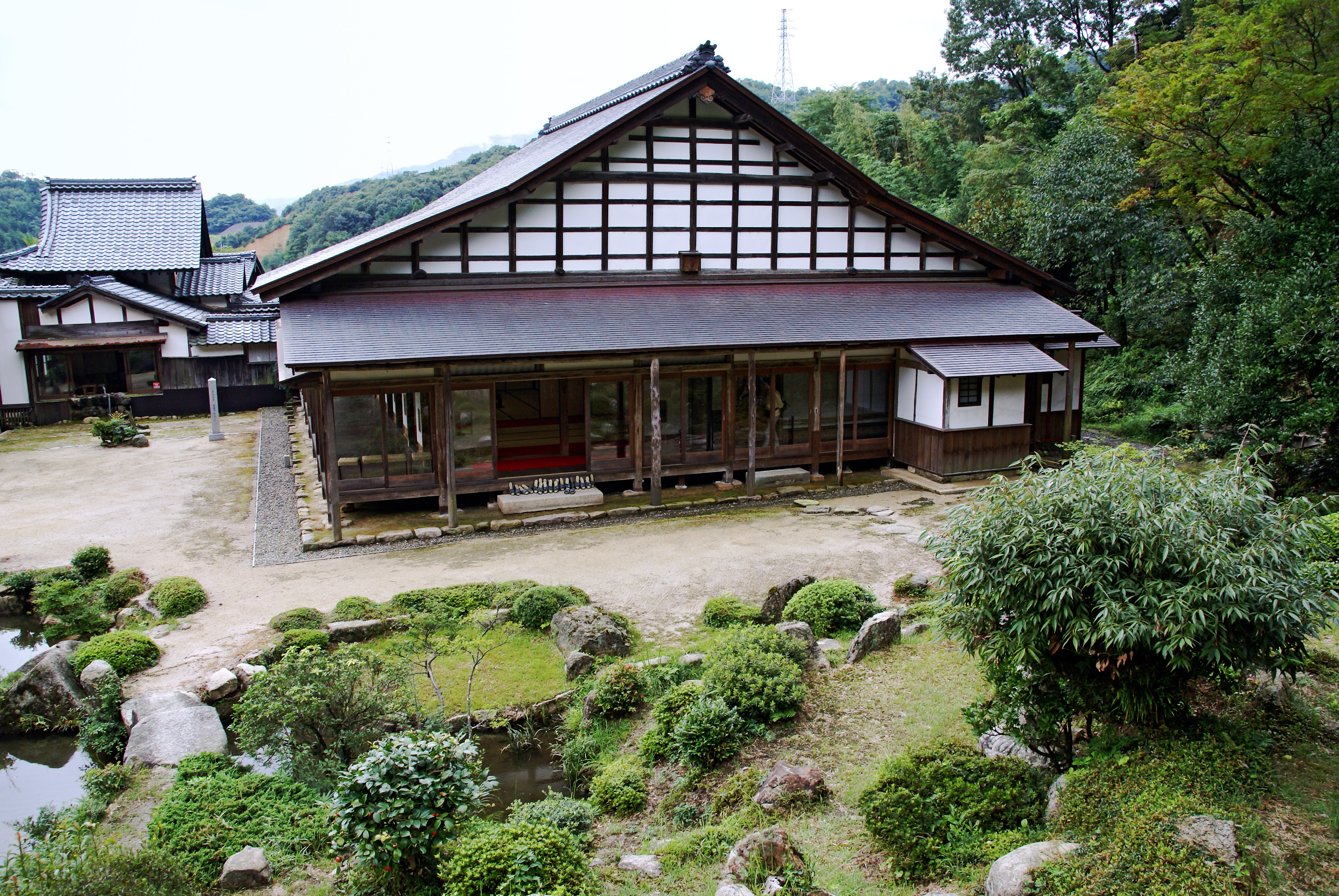
Saifuku-ji's shoin

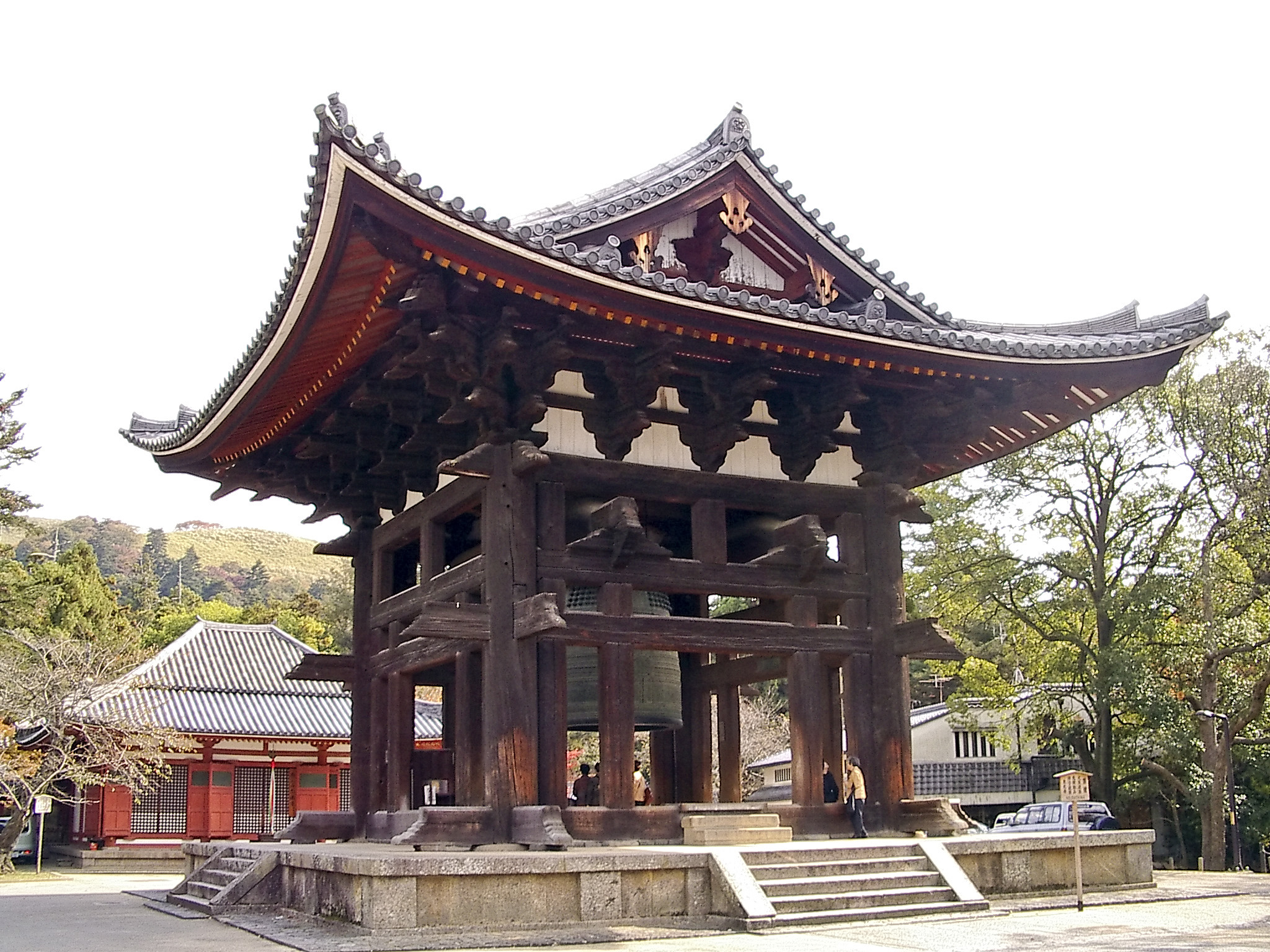
Tōdai-ji's shōrō (an early type)

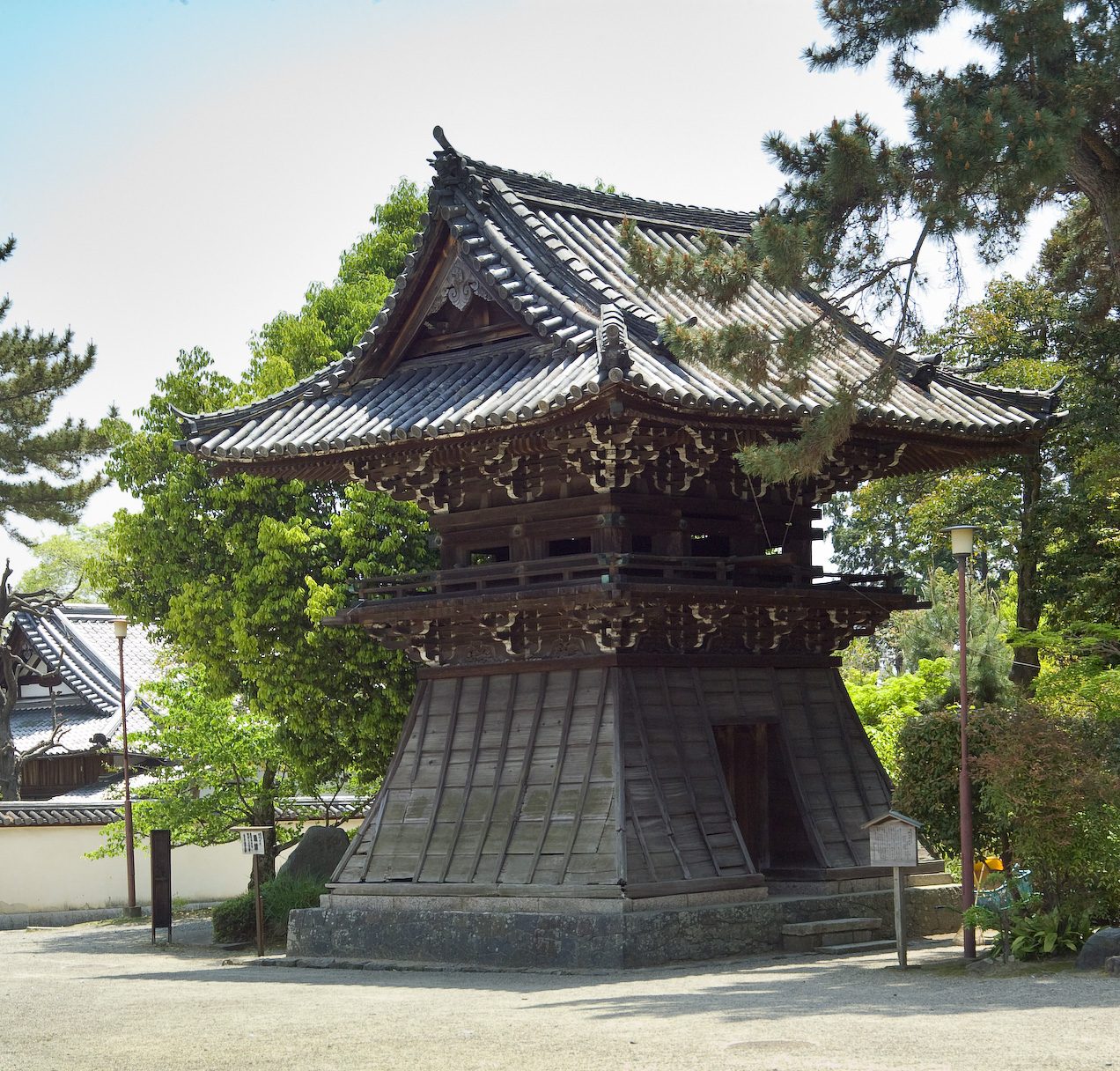
Saidai-ji's shōrō (a later type)

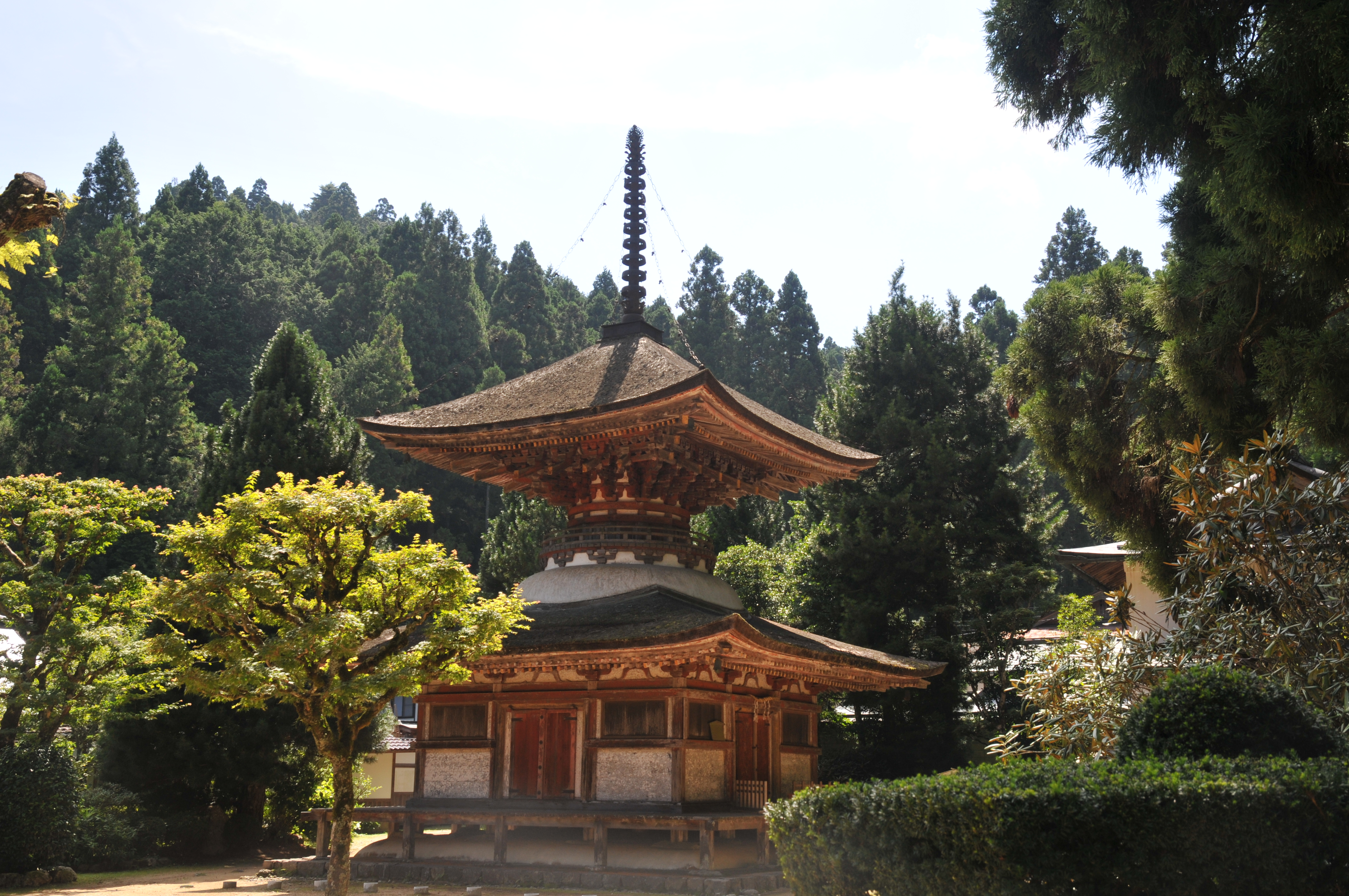
Kongō Sanmai-in's tahōtō (nijū-no-tō)

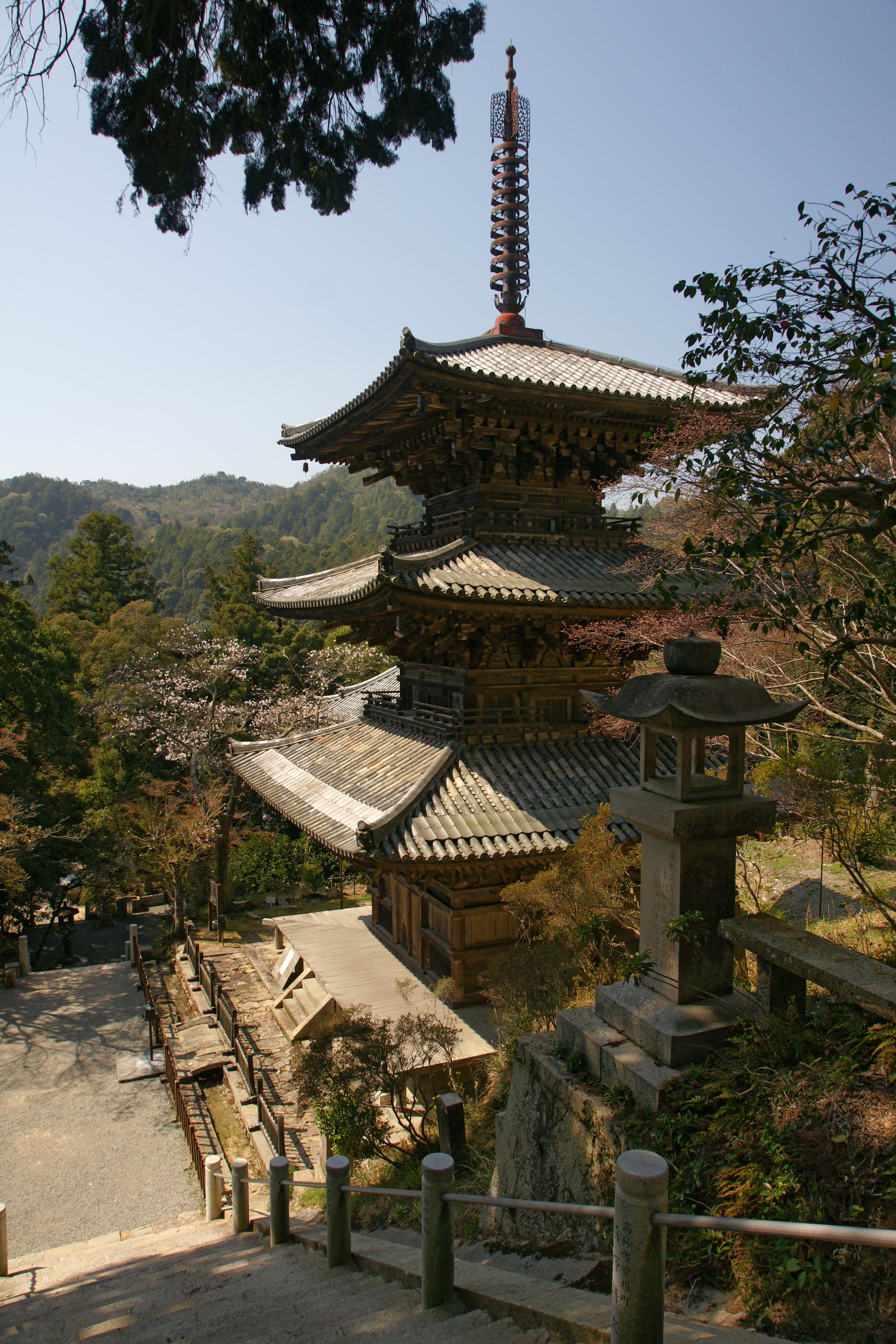
Ichijō-ji's three-tiered pagoda (sanjū-no-tō)

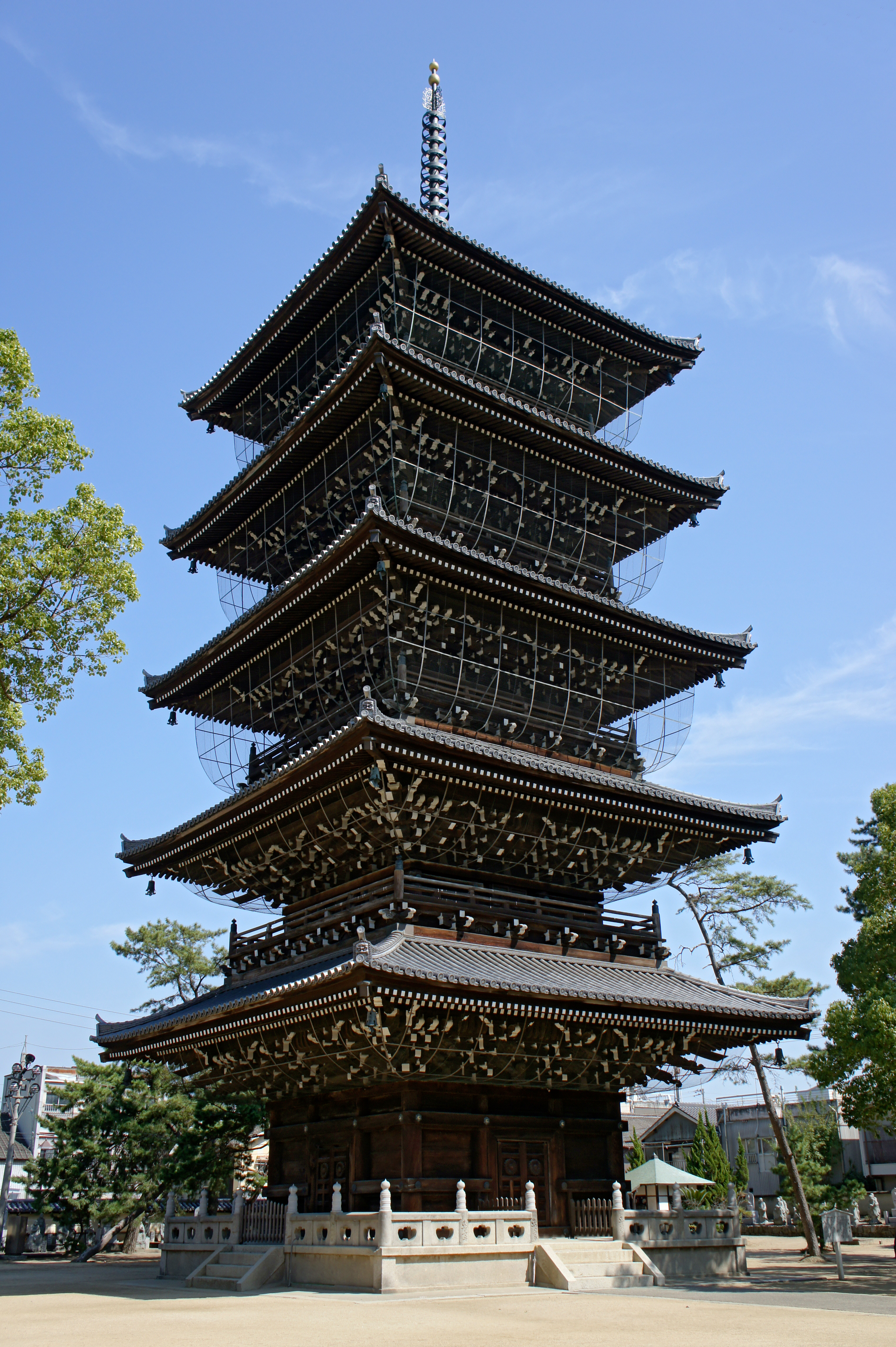
Zentsū-ji's five-tiered pagoda (gojū-no-tō)

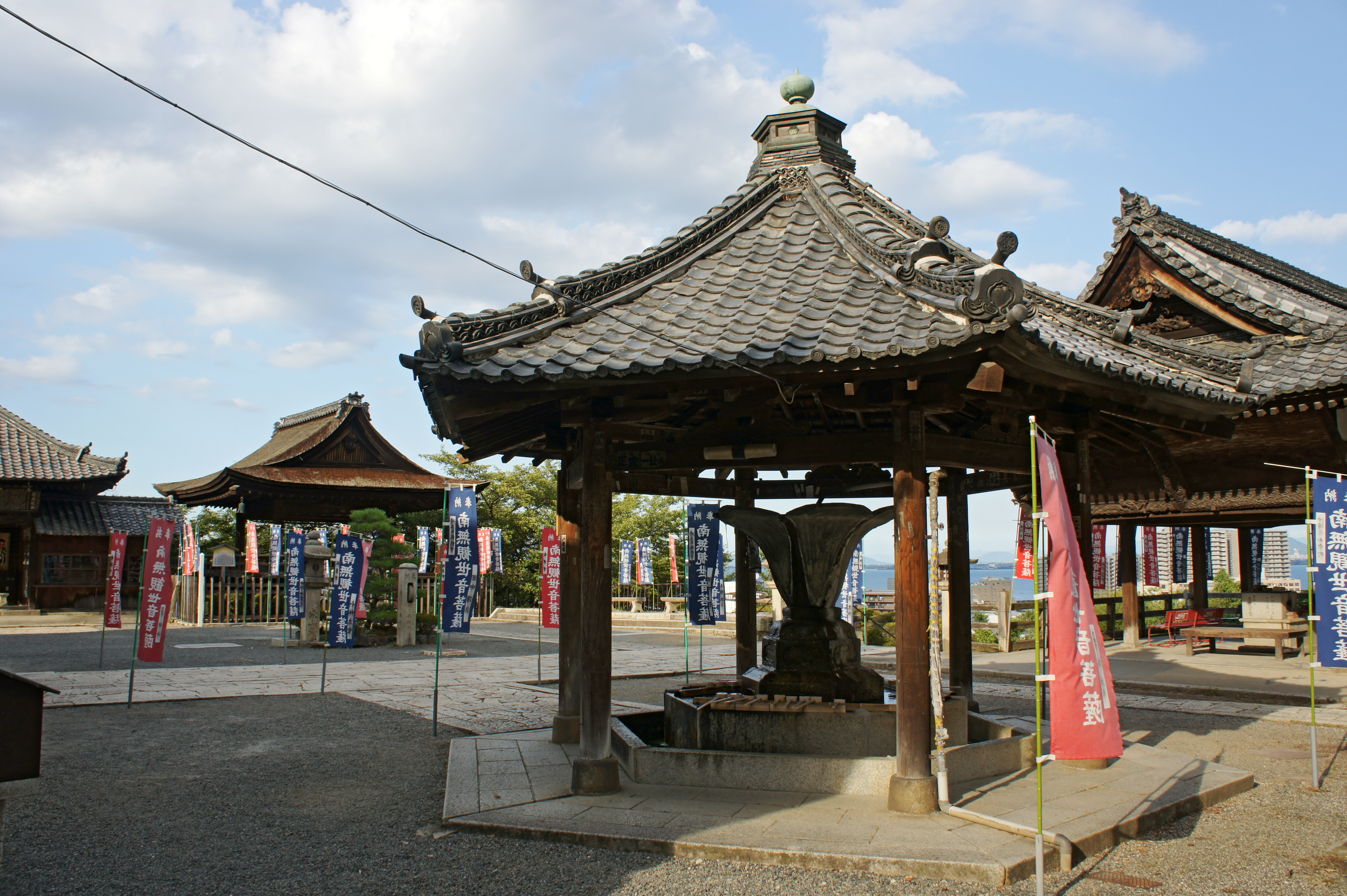
Mii-dera's temizuya

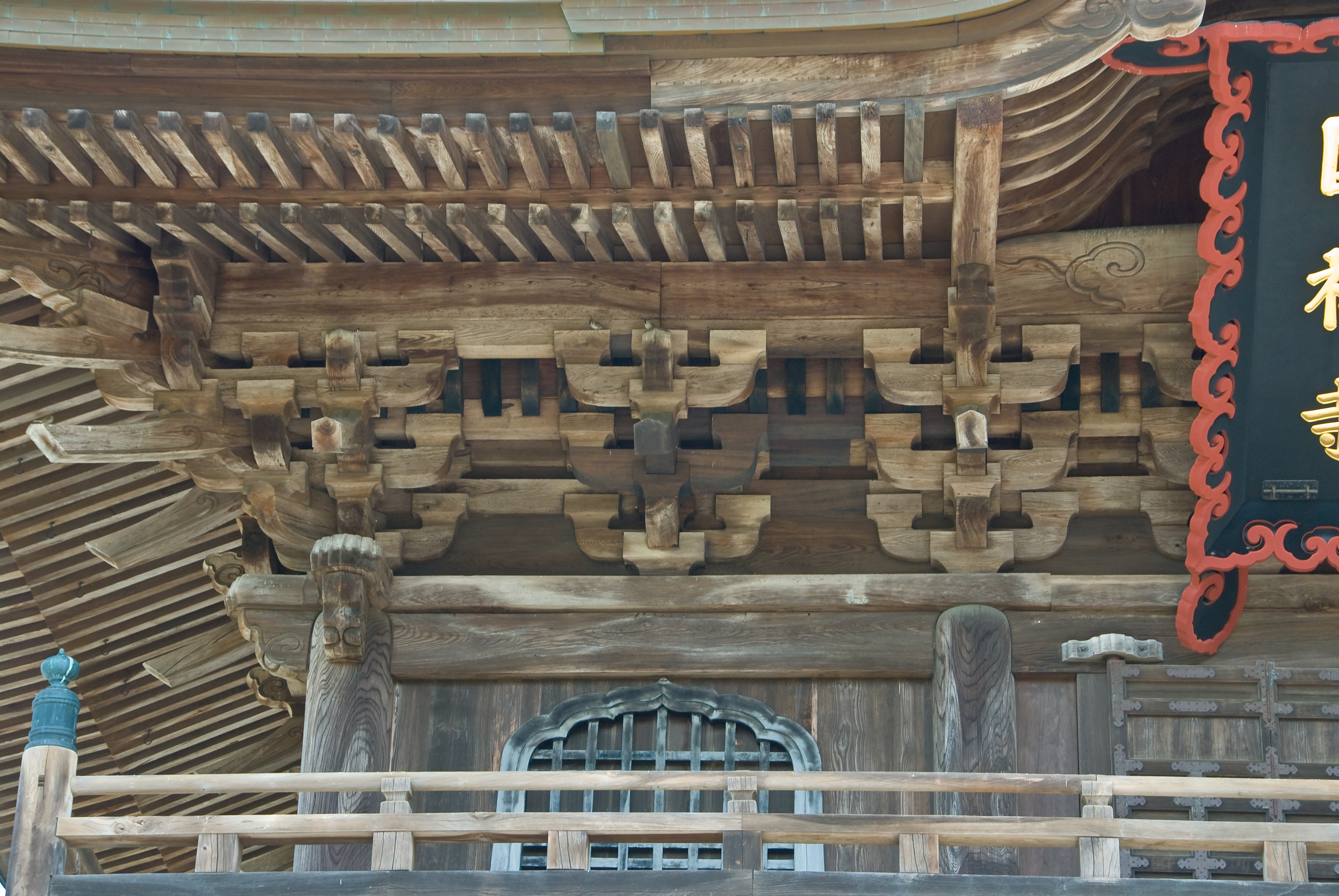
Brackets (tokyō, futatesaki in this case) under the eaves of a sanmon's roof

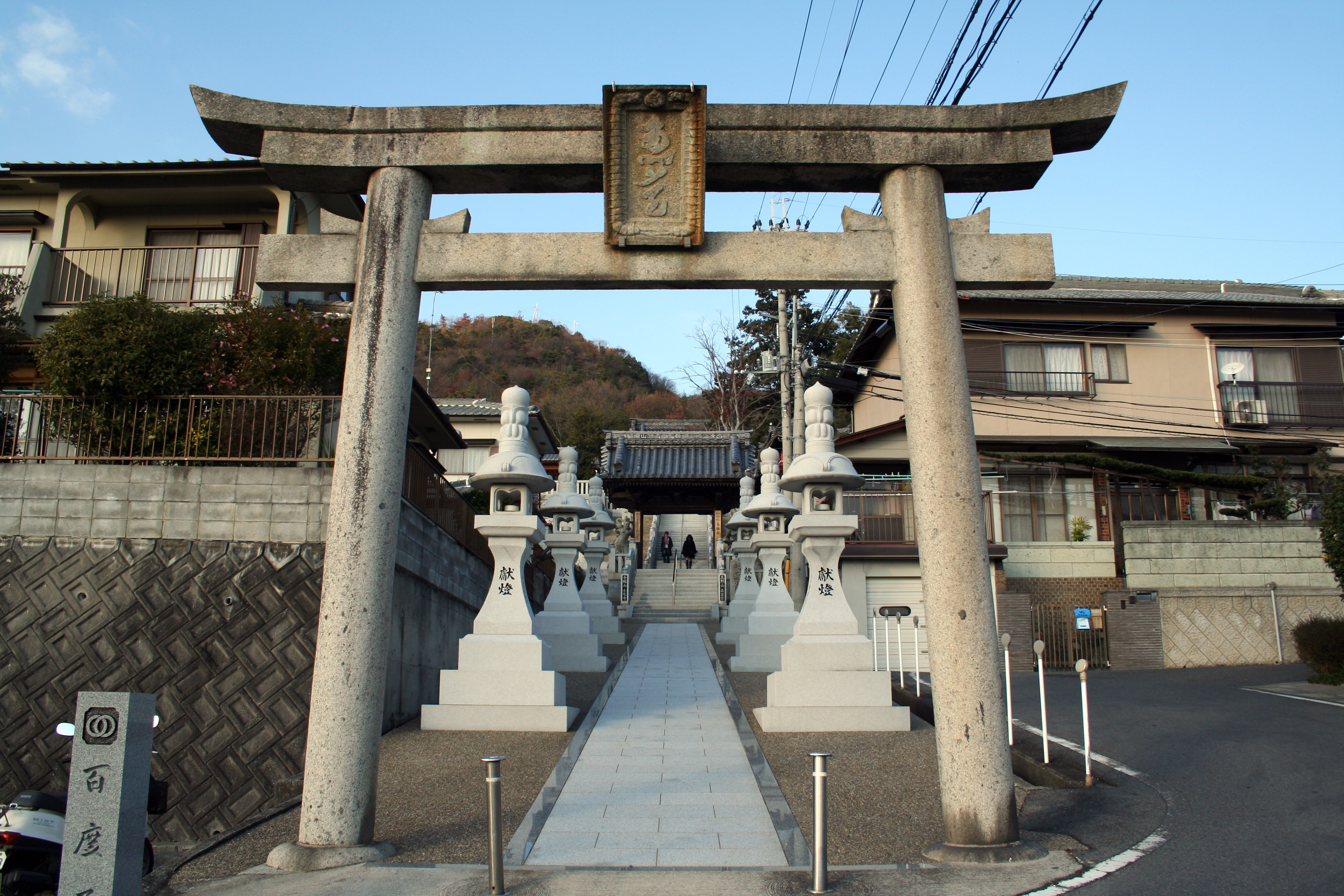
A torii on a temple's (Oyake-ji) sandō

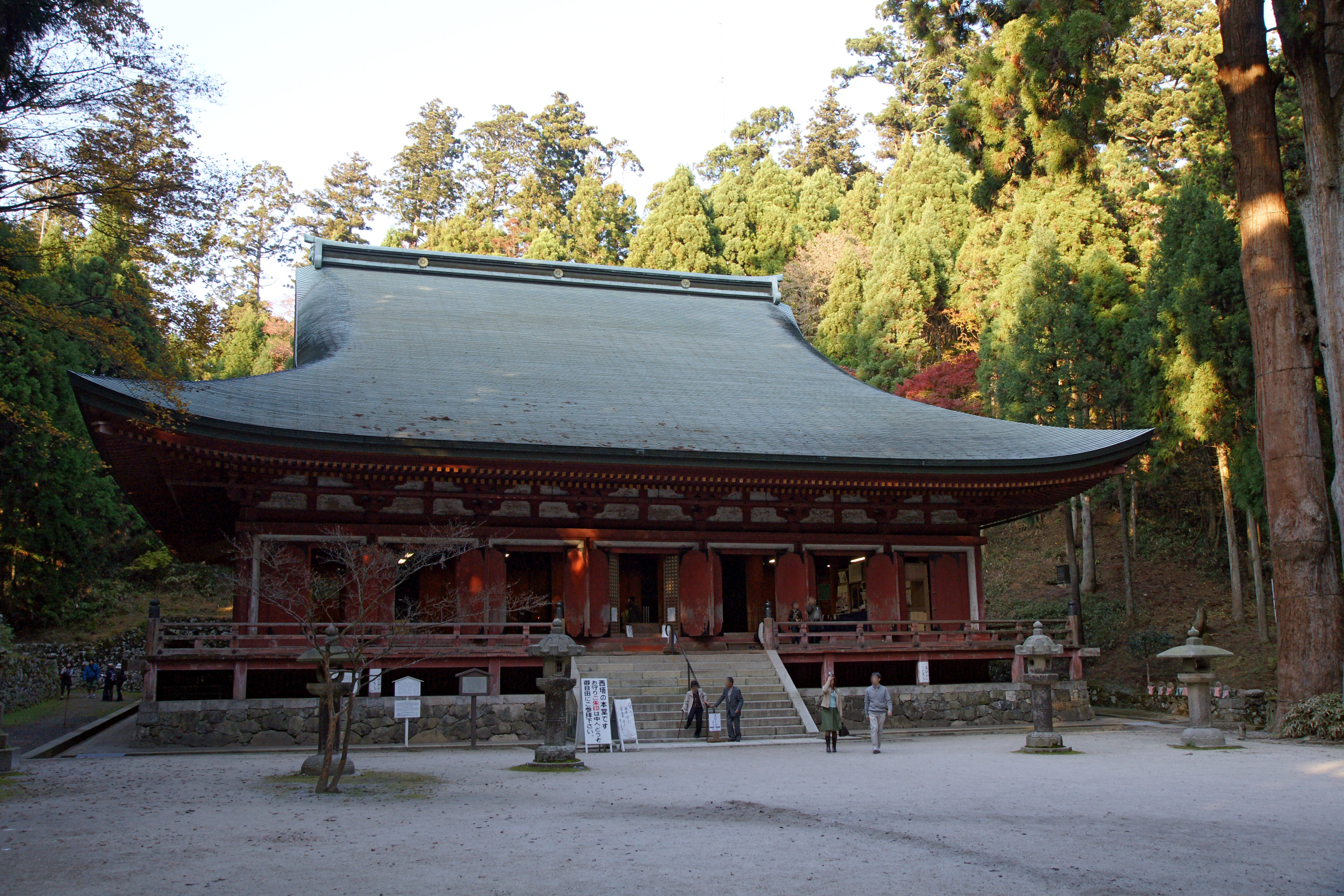
Enryaku-ji's shaka-dō

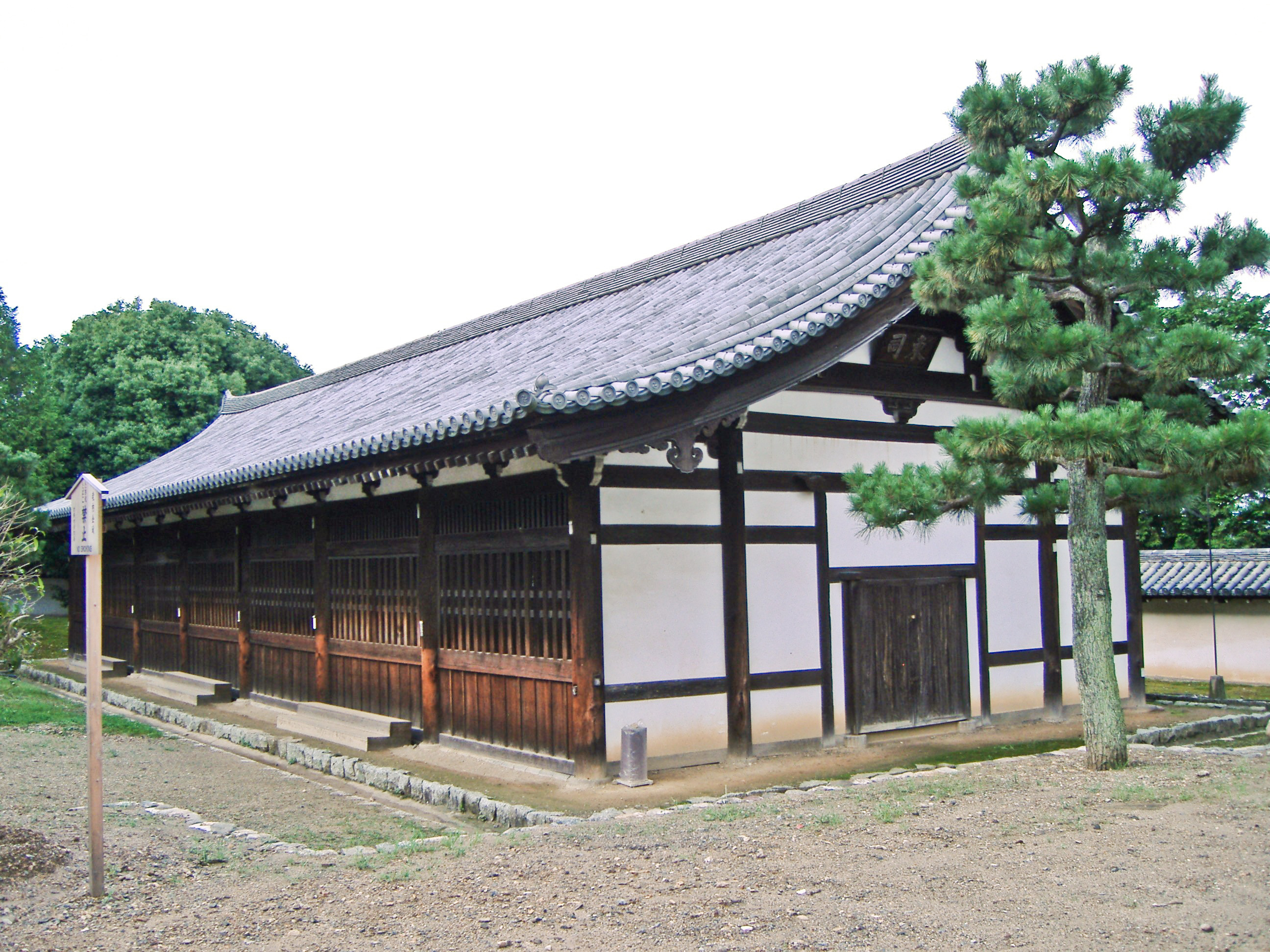
Tōfuku-ji's tōsu

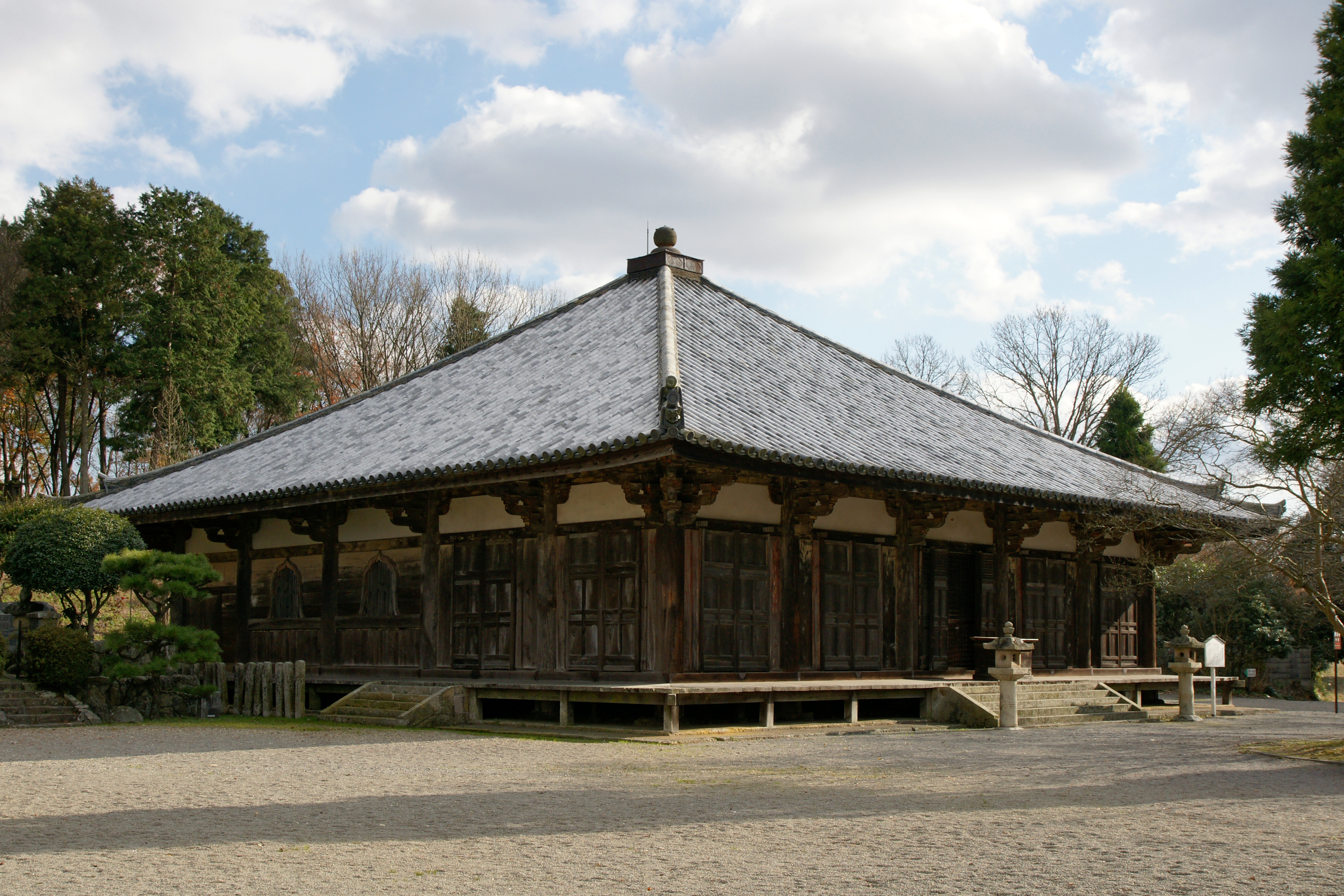
Jōdo-ji's yakushi-dō

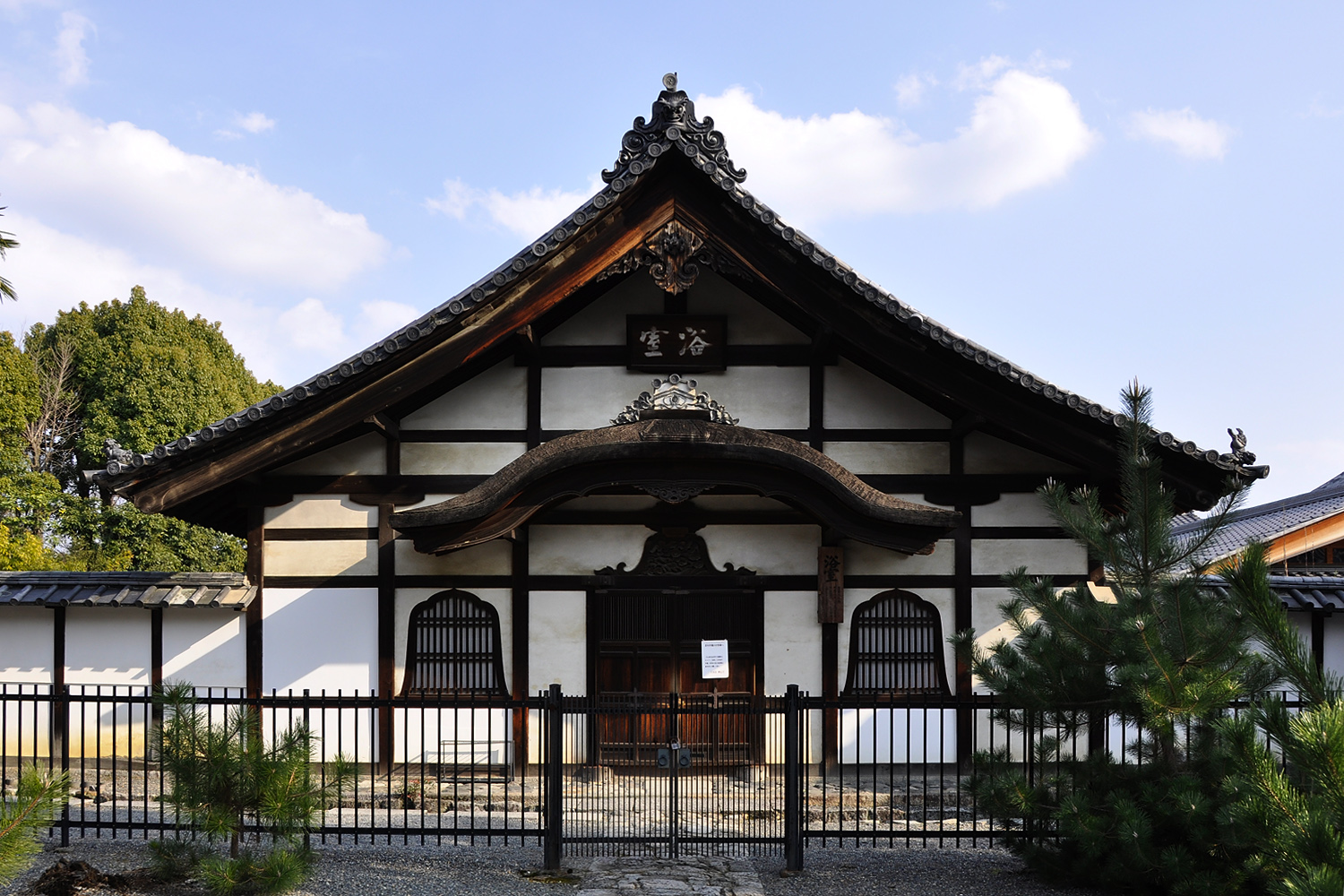
Myōshin-ji's yokushitsu (the temple's baths)

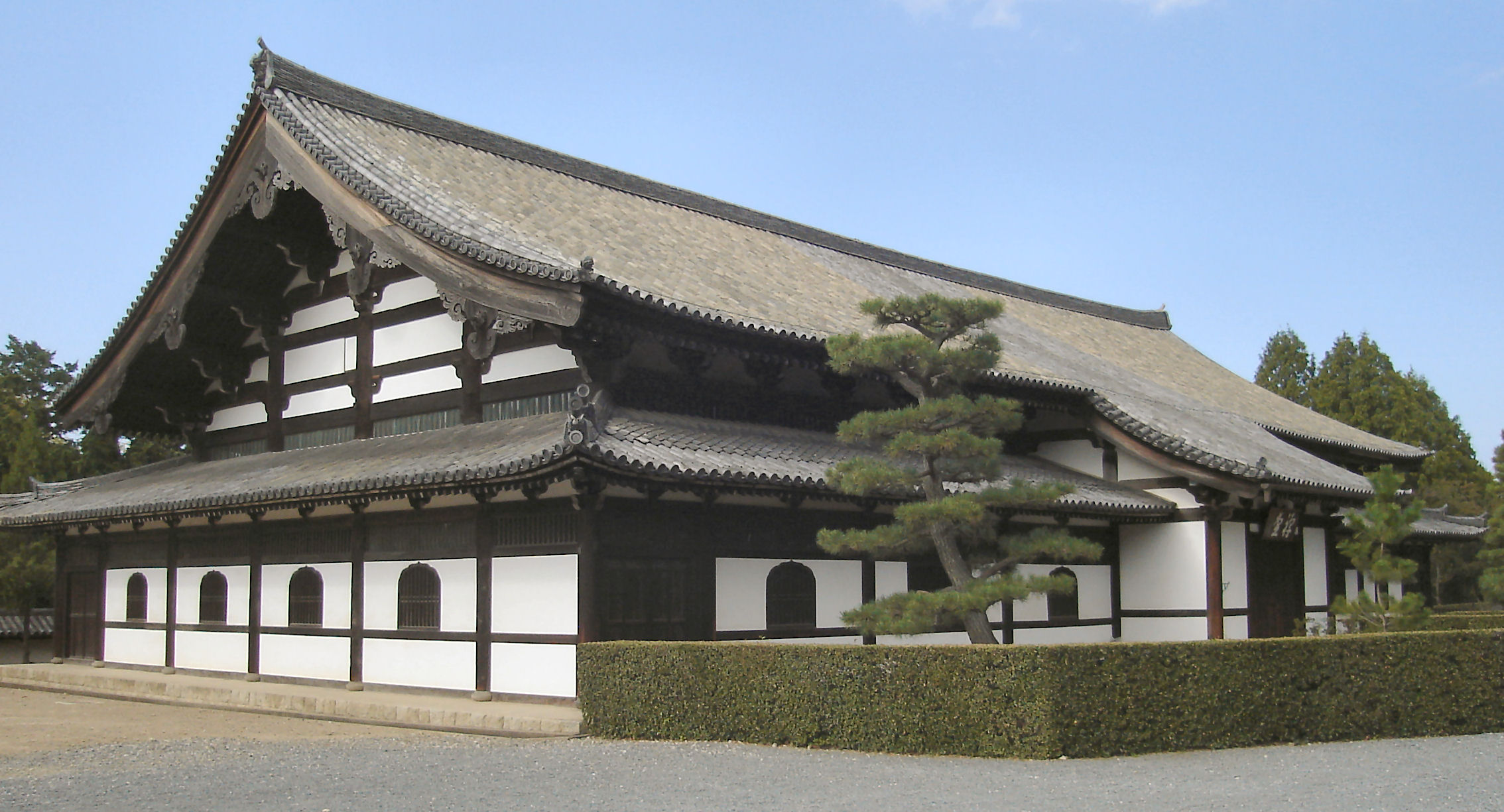
Tōfuku-ji's zen-dō

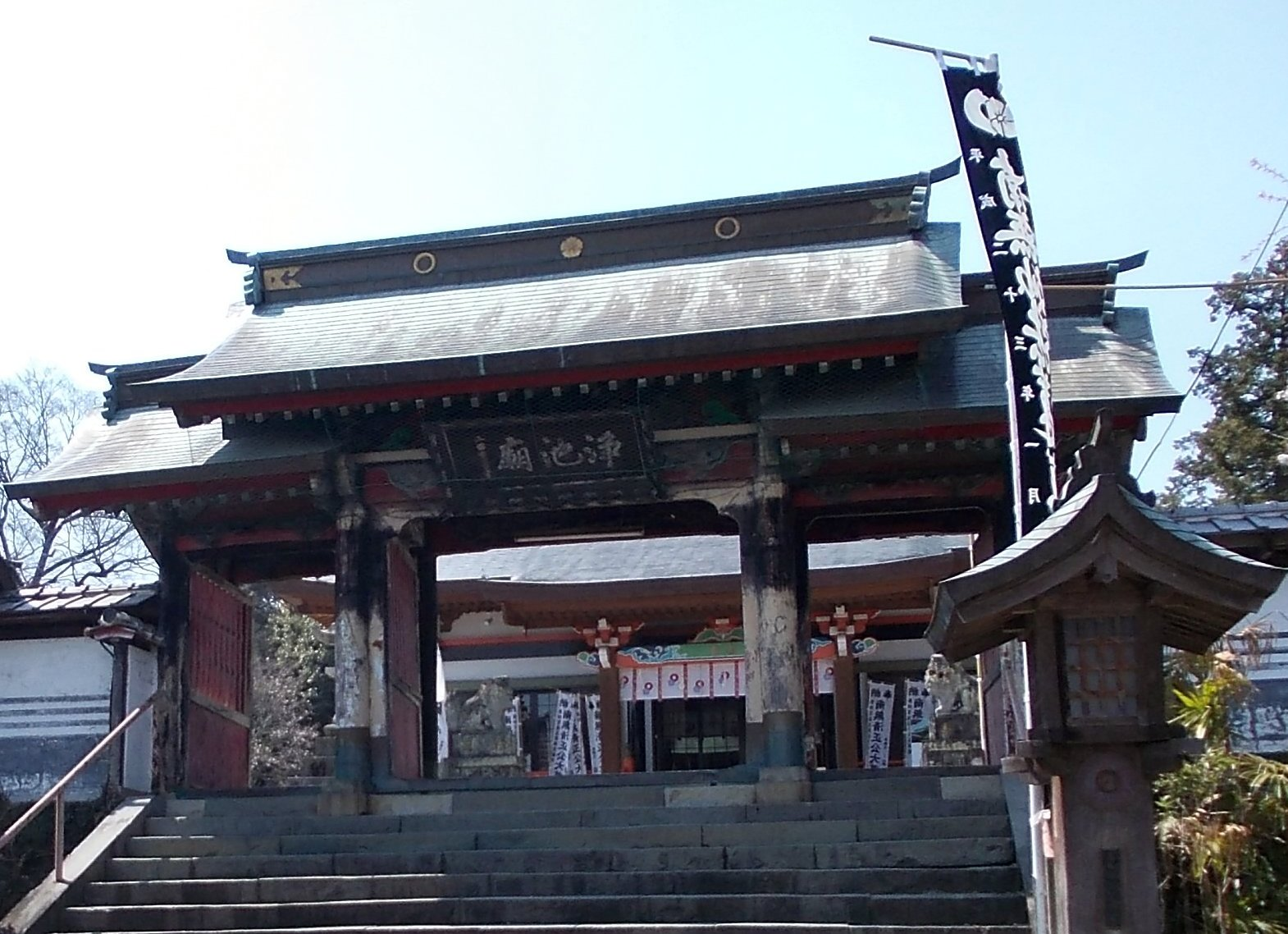
Gate at Jōchibyō, the grave of Katō Kiyomasa at Honmyō-ji, Kumamoto

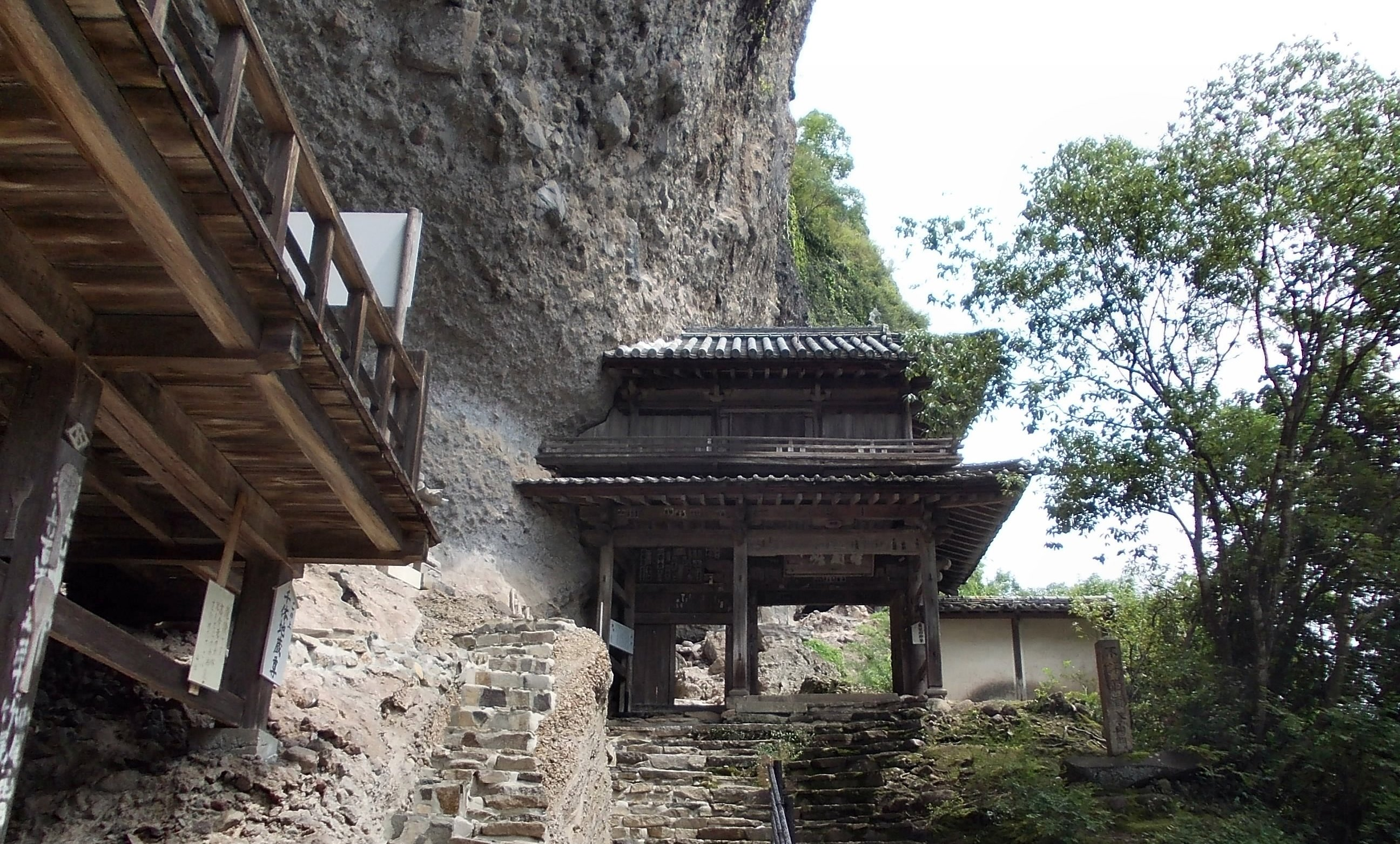
Rakan-ji's Sanmon in Nakatsu

== See also ==
- Buddhism in Japan
- Buddhist architecture
- Buddhist art
- Glossary of Japanese Buddhism
- Japanese art
- List of Buddhist temples
- List of National Treasures of Japan (temples)
- Senjafuda
- Terakoya

== Bibliography ==
- Fletcher, Sir Banister; Cruickshank, Dan (1996) [1896]. Sir Banister Fletcher's a history of architecture (20th illustrated ed.). Architectural Press. ISBN 0-7506-2267-9.
- Fujita Masaya, Koga Shūsaku, ed. (April 10, 1990). Nihon Kenchiku-shi (in Japanese) (September 30, 2008 ed.). Shōwa-dō. ISBN 4-8122-9805-9.
- "Dictionary of Japanese Architectural and Art Historical Terminology (JAANUS)". Japanese Art Net User System.
- Kamakura Shōkō Kaigijo (2008). Kamakura Kankō Bunka Kentei Kōshiki Tekisutobukku (in Japanese). Kamakura: Kamakura Shunshūsha. ISBN 978-4-7740-0386-3.
- Mutsu, Iso (June 1995). "Jufuku-ji". Kamakura: Fact and Legend. Tokyo: Tuttle Publishing. ISBN 0-8048-1968-8.
- Nishi, Kazuo; Hozumi, Kazuo (1996) [1983]. What is Japanese architecture? (illustrated ed.). Kodansha International. ISBN 4-7700-1992-0.
- Ōnuki, Akihiko (2008). Kamakura. Rekishi to Fushigi wo Aruku (in Japanese). Tokyo: Jitsugyō no Nihonsha. ISBN 978-4-408-59306-7.
- Sansom, George (1962). "Japan: A Short Cultural History." New York: Appleton-Century Crofts, Inc.
- Young, David; Young, Michiko (2007) [2004]. The art of Japanese architecture. Architecture and Interior Design (illustrated, revised ed.). Tuttle Publishing. ISBN 978-0-8048-3838-2.
