= Bombing of Kōfu in World War II =

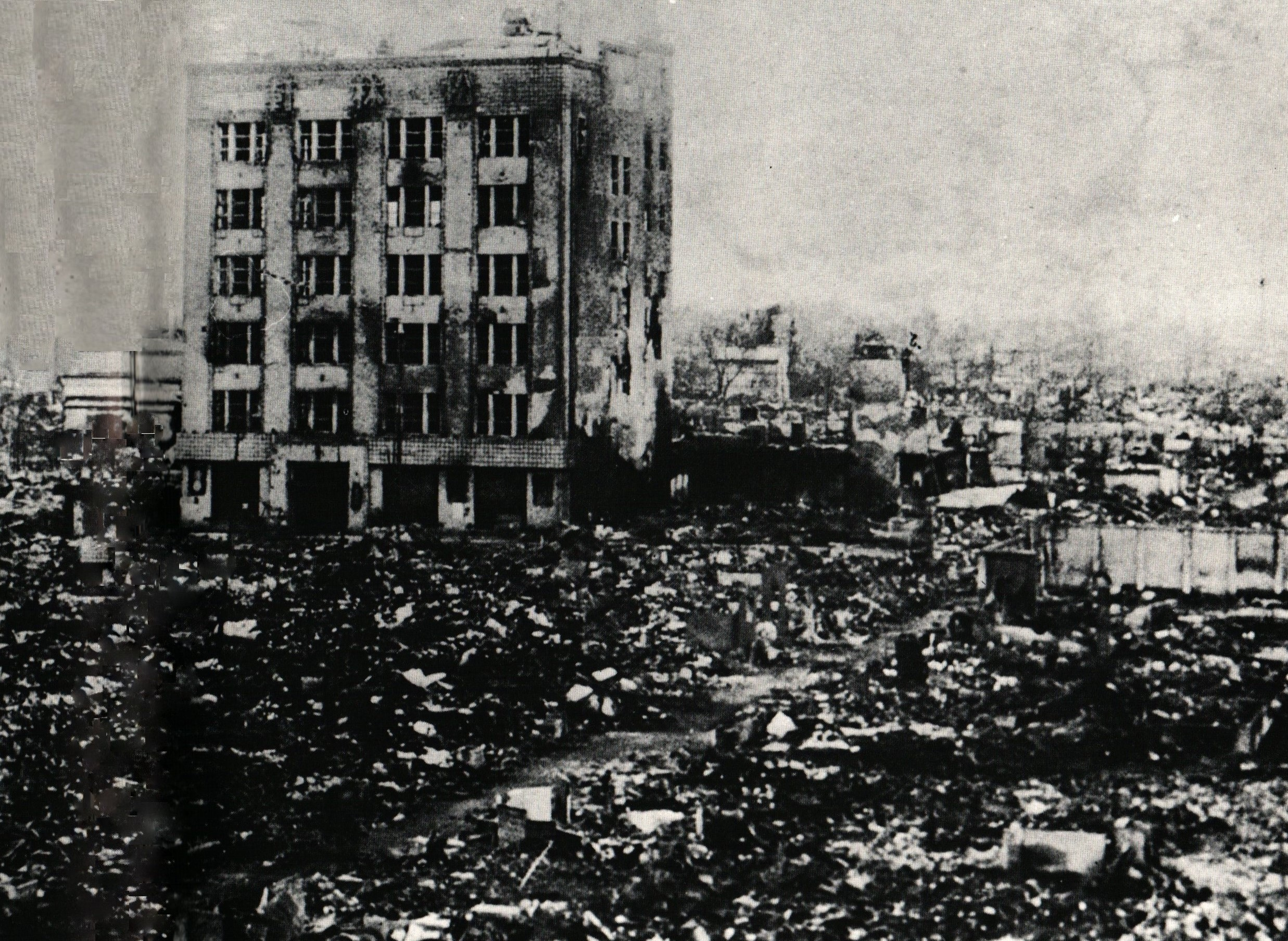
Kōfu after the 1945 air raids

The bombing of Kōfu (甲府空襲, Kōfu kūshū) was part of the air raids on Japan strategic bombing campaign waged by the United States against military and civilian targets and population centers of the Empire of Japan during the Japan home islands campaign in the closing stages of the Pacific War in 1945.

== Background ==
Kōfu is a medium-sized population center and the capital of rural Yamanashi Prefecture. Many residents had the illusion that its surrounding mountains would provide some protection, and that without any targets of significant military importance, Kōfu would be overlooked by the Americans. Numerous residents of Tokyo had relocated to Kōfu for safety. These included the noted authors Osamu Dazai and Masuji Ibuse. However, as Kōfu was located near Mount Fuji, which was a prominent landmark, once air raids on Japan became more frequent during the final stages of the Pacific War, Kōfu residents became accustomed to the sight of American aircraft passing over the city at high altitude en route to targets in Tokyo and in Nagano Prefecture, and Kōfu occasionally became a secondary target for aircraft which missed their primary targets. Such bombings caused little damage, and civil defense efforts did not begin until around March 1945; however, the construction of air raid shelters was largely impossible due to the high groundwater level, and efforts were largely limited to training civilian tonarigumi associations on using bucket brigades for firefighting.

== Air raid ==
The main air raid on Kōfu was a firebombing attack, which occurred during the night of 6 July 1945, beginning with a USAAF B-29 Superfortress bomber dropping 13 incendiary bombs directly on the Kōfu city hospital. Carpet bombing of the city then commenced by 230 B-29 bombers of the USAAF 39th Bombardment Group and 330th Bombardment Group. Due to cloud cover over the city, most planes released their payload of M47 napalm bomb and E-46 incendiary cluster bombs (the same as were used in the Tokyo air raid) from an altitude of between 13,400 and 14,600 feet (4,084 and 4,450 meters) using radar.

A year after the war, the United States Army Air Forces's Strategic Bombing Survey (Pacific War) reported approximately 79% of the city’s urban area had been totally destroyed, with 740 civilians killed, and 1,248 seriously wounded; with 35 people missing and 18,094 residences destroyed.

== See also ==
- Air raids on Japan
- Evacuations of civilians in Japan during World War II
