= Yamanashi Eiwa College =

University in Yamanashi Prefecture, Japan

Coordinates: 35.6614°N 138.614°E

- 山梨英和大学
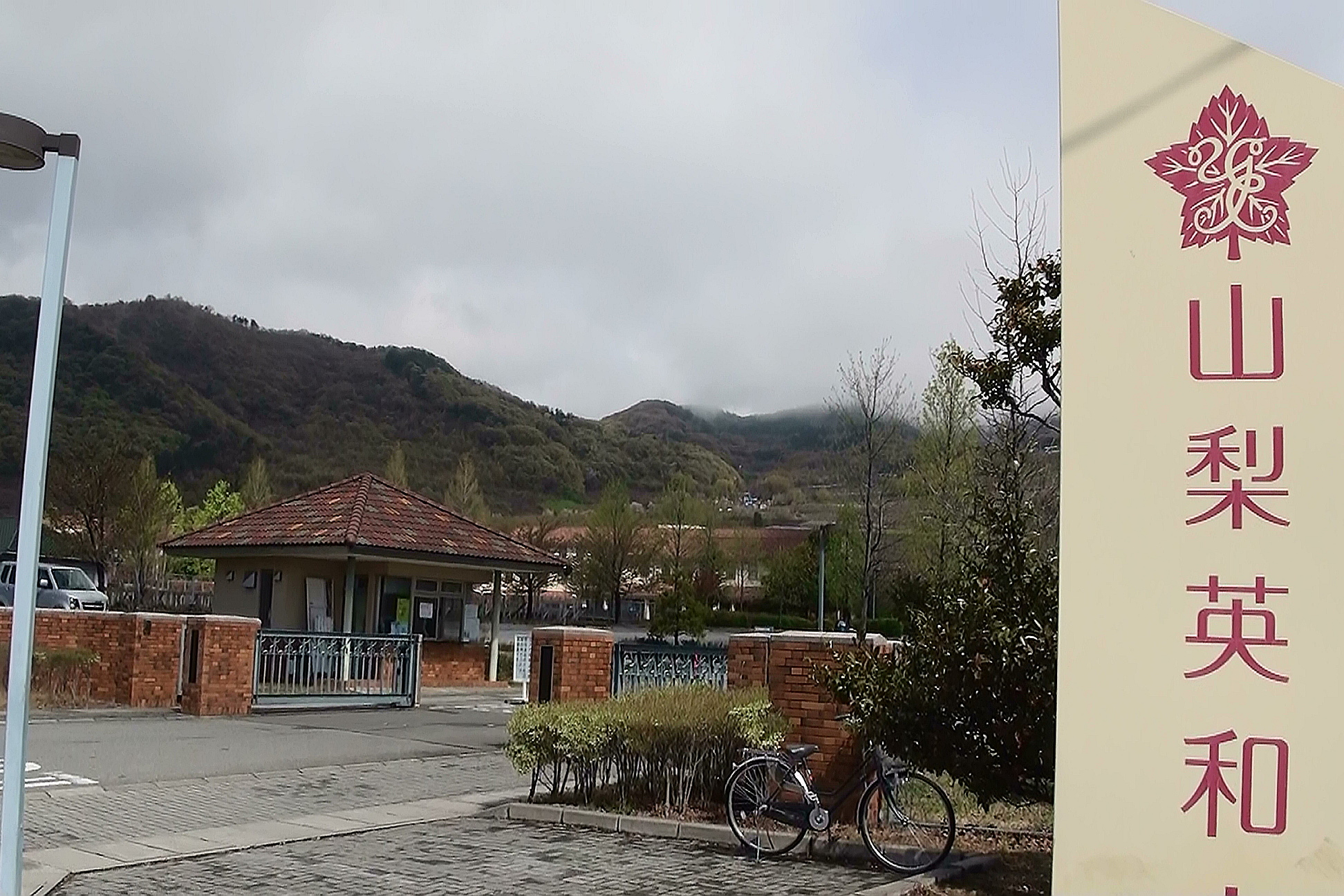
- Type: Private
- Established: 1889
- President: George W. Gish, Jr.
- Location: Kofu, Yamanashi, Japan
- Website: Official website

Yamanashi Eiwa College (山梨英和大学, Yamanashi eiwa daigaku) is a private university in Kofu, Yamanashi Prefecture, Japan. The predecessor of the school, a women's school, was founded in 1889 and was chartered as a junior college in 1966. It became coeducational in 2001 and became a four-year college the following year.
