= Kai Zenkō-ji =

Temple in Kōfu, Yamanashi Prefecture, Japan

Coordinates: 35°39′58″N 138°35′35″E

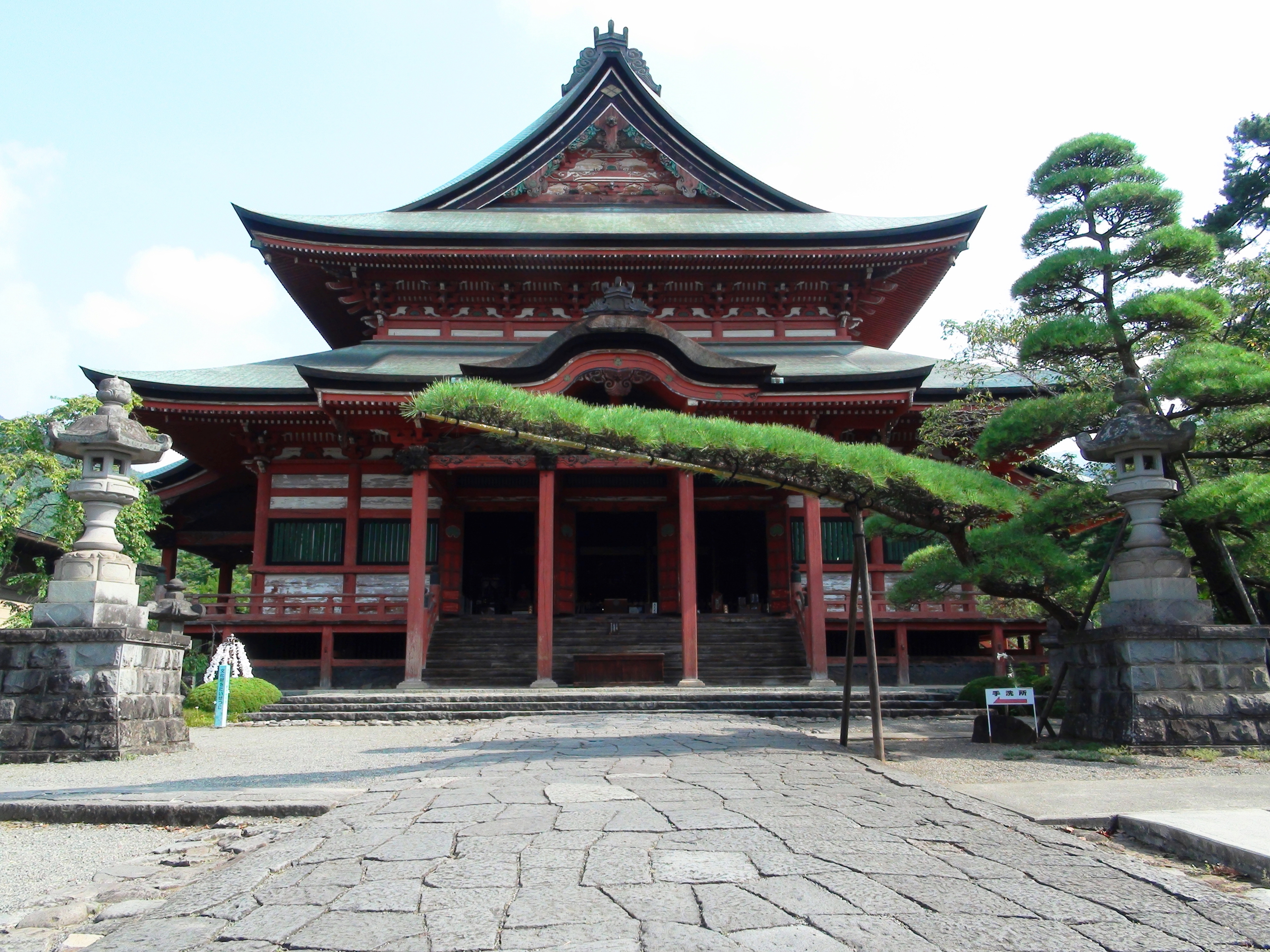
The Main Hall

Zenkō-ji (善光寺), or, to distinguish it from temples with the same name, Kai Zenkō-ji (甲斐善光寺), with the mountain name Jōgaku-zan (定額山) is a temple of the Jōdo-shū sect located in Kōfu, Yamanashi Prefecture, Japan.

== History ==
When Takeda Shingen got into trouble in the war with Uesugi Kenshin, he brought the temple treasures of Zenkō-ji in Nagano to this area and built a new temple of the same name in 1558. After 6 years of construction, the first buildings were finished in 1565, and by 1568 the temple complex had taken shape. After Shingen's death in 1573, the temple was not fully completed and the temple treasures were not preserved. The main figure became a standing Buddha (前立仏 Maedachi-butsu ), and the temple became the head of the Jōdo-shū sect in the province. The Tokugawa clan also supported the temple during the Edo Period.

In 1754, most of the complex burned down, but was rebuilt in the architectural style of the era by 1796. In 1937, it was incorporated into the city of Kōfu.

== Gate ==
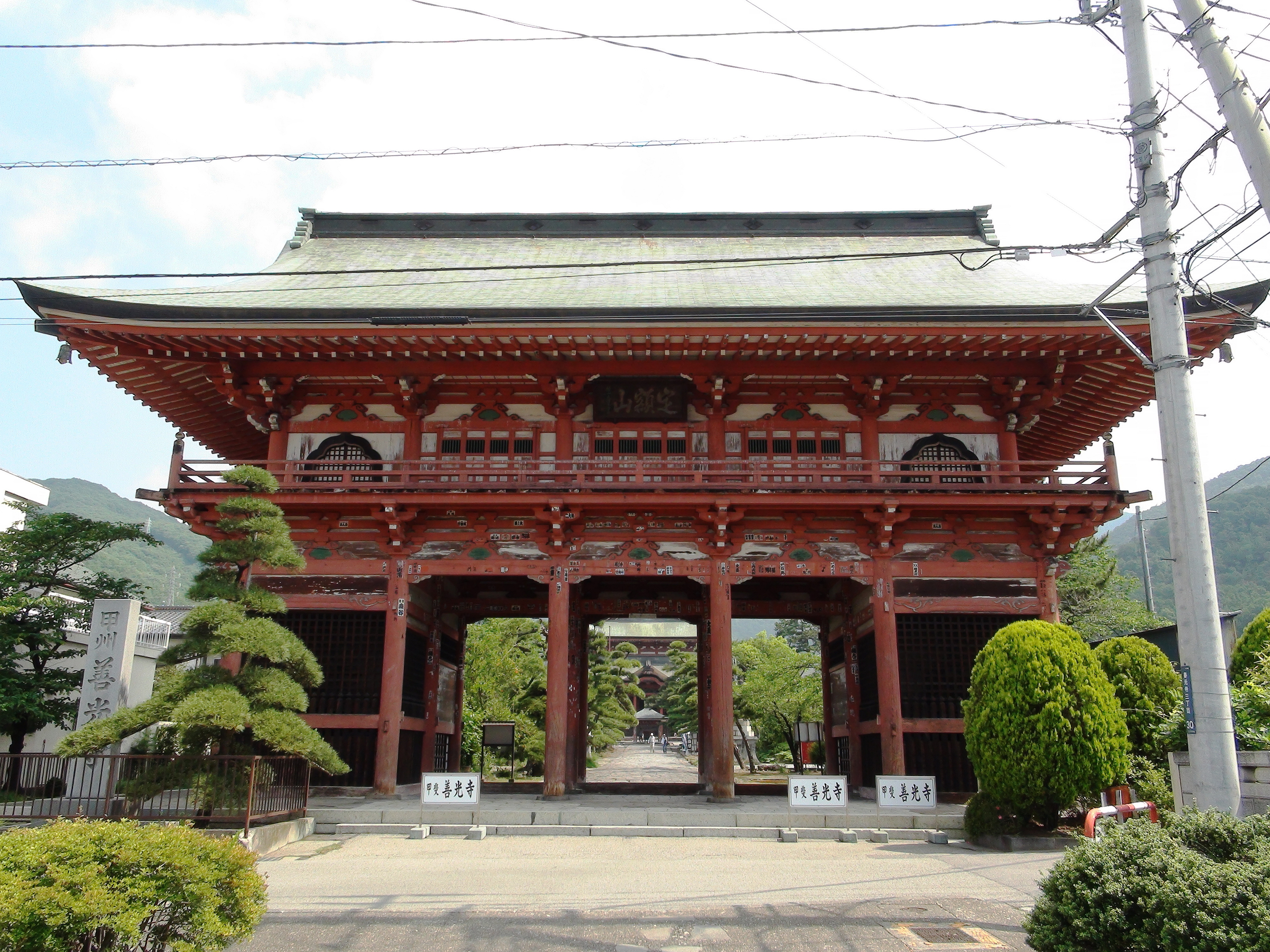
The Main Gate

The main gate (山門 Sanmon) to the temple grounds is designed as a two-story rōmon. It is 16.88 m wide, 6.758 m deep and 15 m high, with a roof width of 22.9 m. It is designed in a mixed style of Japanese and Chinese elements. The two guardian figures (仁王Niō ) are distributed to the right and left below. The gate is registered as an important cultural asset of Japan .

The current main hall (金堂 Kondō ) was completed in 1796 after thirty years of construction. It is 23 m wide, 38 m deep and 26 m high, making it one of the larger temple buildings in Japan. The building is similar in depth to the original Zenko-ji and has the same Shumoku-style roof (撞木造り-zukuri ). The main hall, like the gate, is registered as an Important Cultural Property.

== Treasures ==
In the main hall, in a shrine (厨子 Zushi) on the altar, there is the main figure, an Amida Buddha made of bronze, protected by an attendant on either side. The Buddha is unusually tall at 1.42 m. An inscription states that it dates from 1195. In the hall there are two more Amida with attendants, which are also registered as important cultural assets.

Other treasures include a temple bell (梵鐘 Bonshō ) from 1313 and a picture of Minamoto no Yoritomo from 1336.
