= Kōfu =

Kōfu 甲府市
- Prefecture capital and Core city
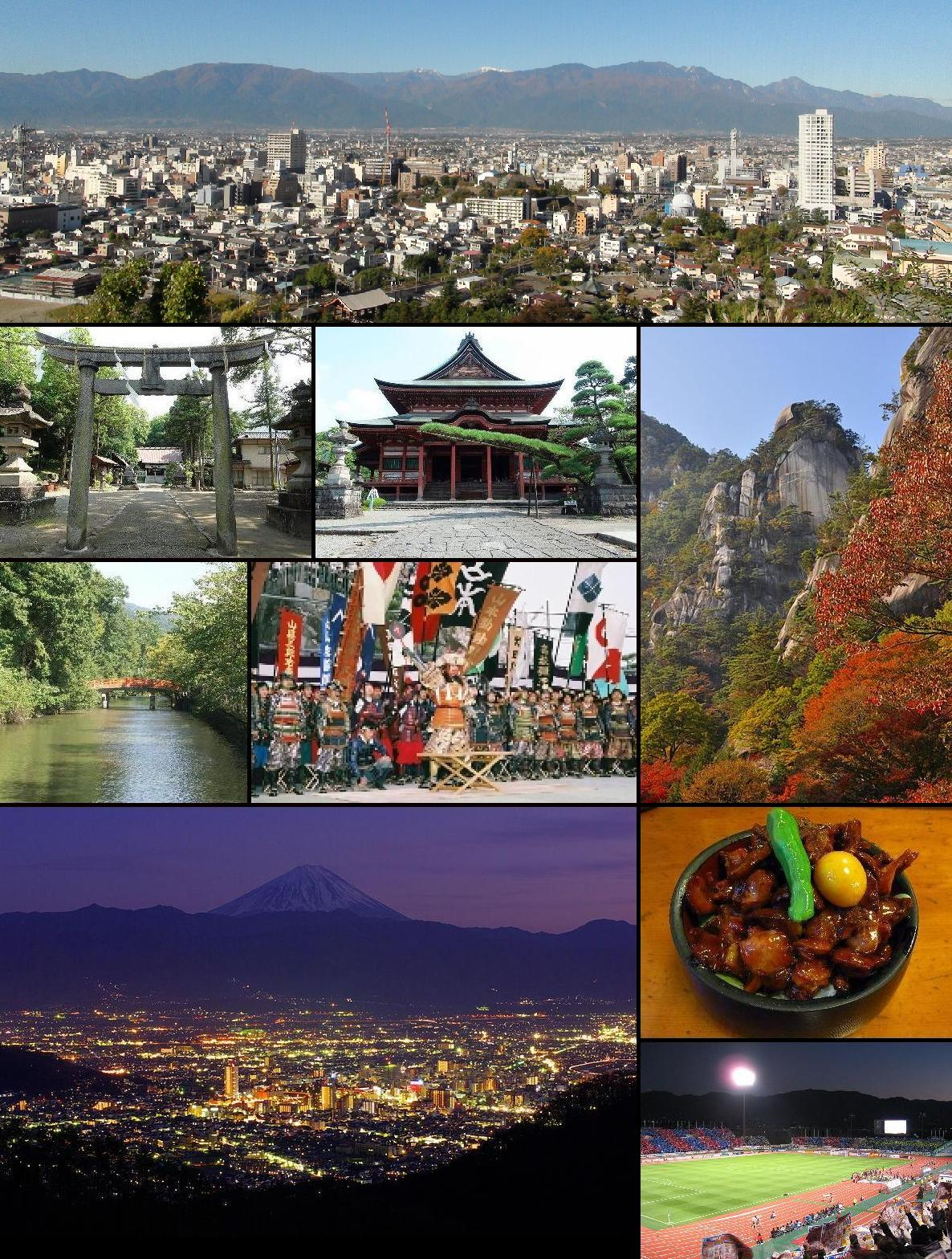
- View from Sakaori miya Kai-Zenko-ji, Kakueno in autumn Moats of Kofu Castle, Takeda Shingen festival Night view of Kofu, Kofu motsu-ni stew Kose Sports Stadium

- Flag Emblem
- Interactive map of Kōfu
- Location within Japan
- Coordinates: 35°39′43.7″N 138°34′5.6″E
- Country: Japan
- Region: Chūbu (Tōkai)
- Prefecture: Yamanashi
- First official recorded: 100 BC
- City Settled: July 1, 1889

Government
  - Mayor: Yūichi Higuchi (since February 2015)

Area
  - Total: 212.47 km^{2} (82.04 sq mi)

Population (July 1, 2019)
  - Total: 187,985
  - Density: 884.76/km^{2} (2,291.5/sq mi)
- Time zone: UTC+9 (Japan Standard Time)
- Tree: Quercus
- Flower: Dianthus
- Bird: Common kingfisher
- Phone number: 055-237-1161
- Address: 2-17-1 Aioi, Kōfu-shi, Yamanashi-ken400-8585
- Website: Official website

Kōfu (甲府市, Kōfu-shi; Japanese pronunciation: [kò̞ó̞.ɸɯ̈́, -ɸɯ̥̈.ɕì, kó̞ó̞-]) is the capital city of Yamanashi Prefecture, Japan. As of 1 April 2019, the city had an estimated population of 187,985 in 90,924 households, and a population density of 880 persons per km^{2}. The total area of the city is 212.41 square kilometres (82.01 sq mi).

== Overview ==
=== Toponymy ===
Kōfu's name means "capital of Kai Province". During the Sengoku period, it was famous as the stronghold of Takeda Shingen.

=== Cityscapes ===
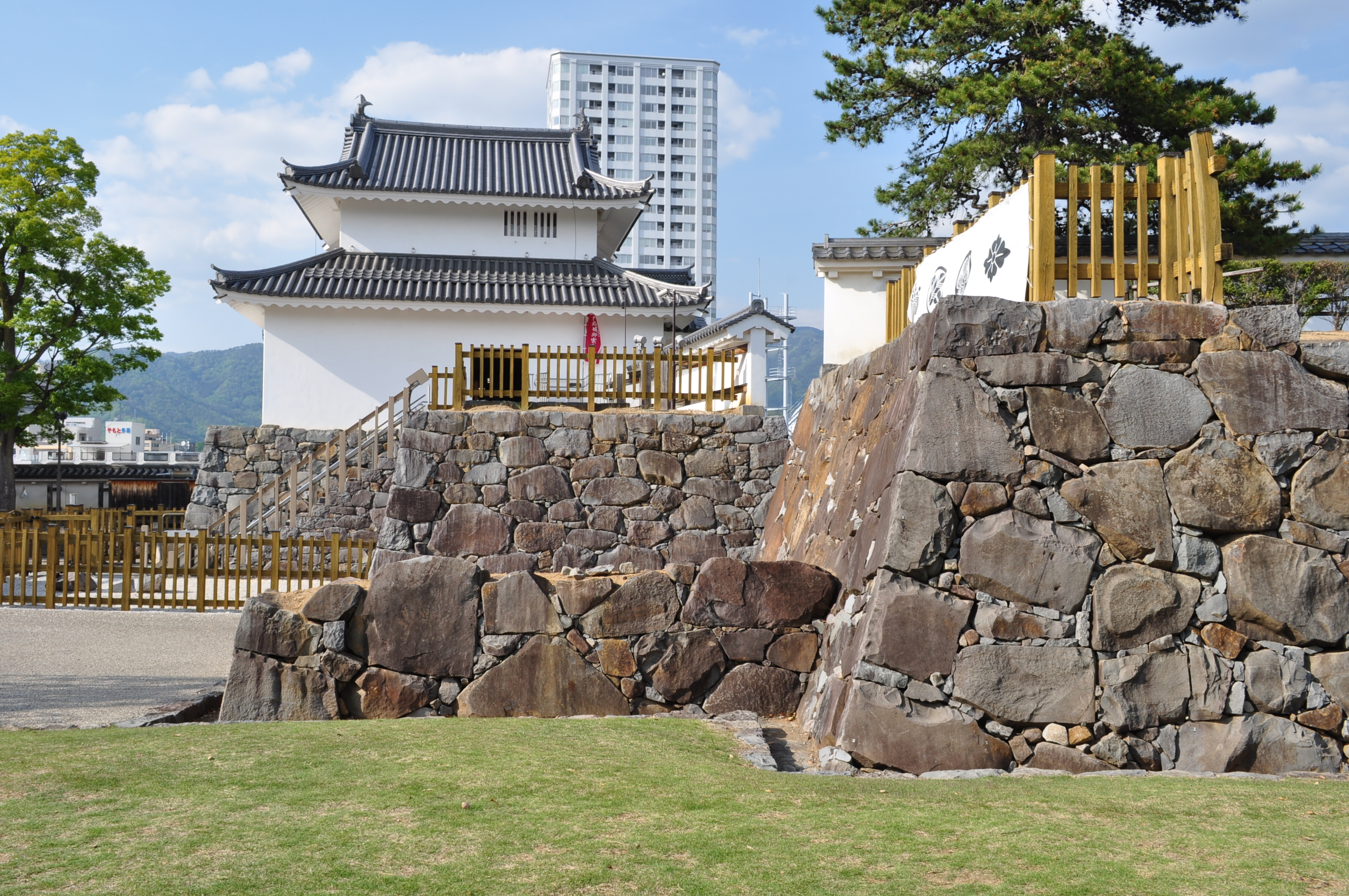
Kōfu Castle (Maizuru Castle Park)

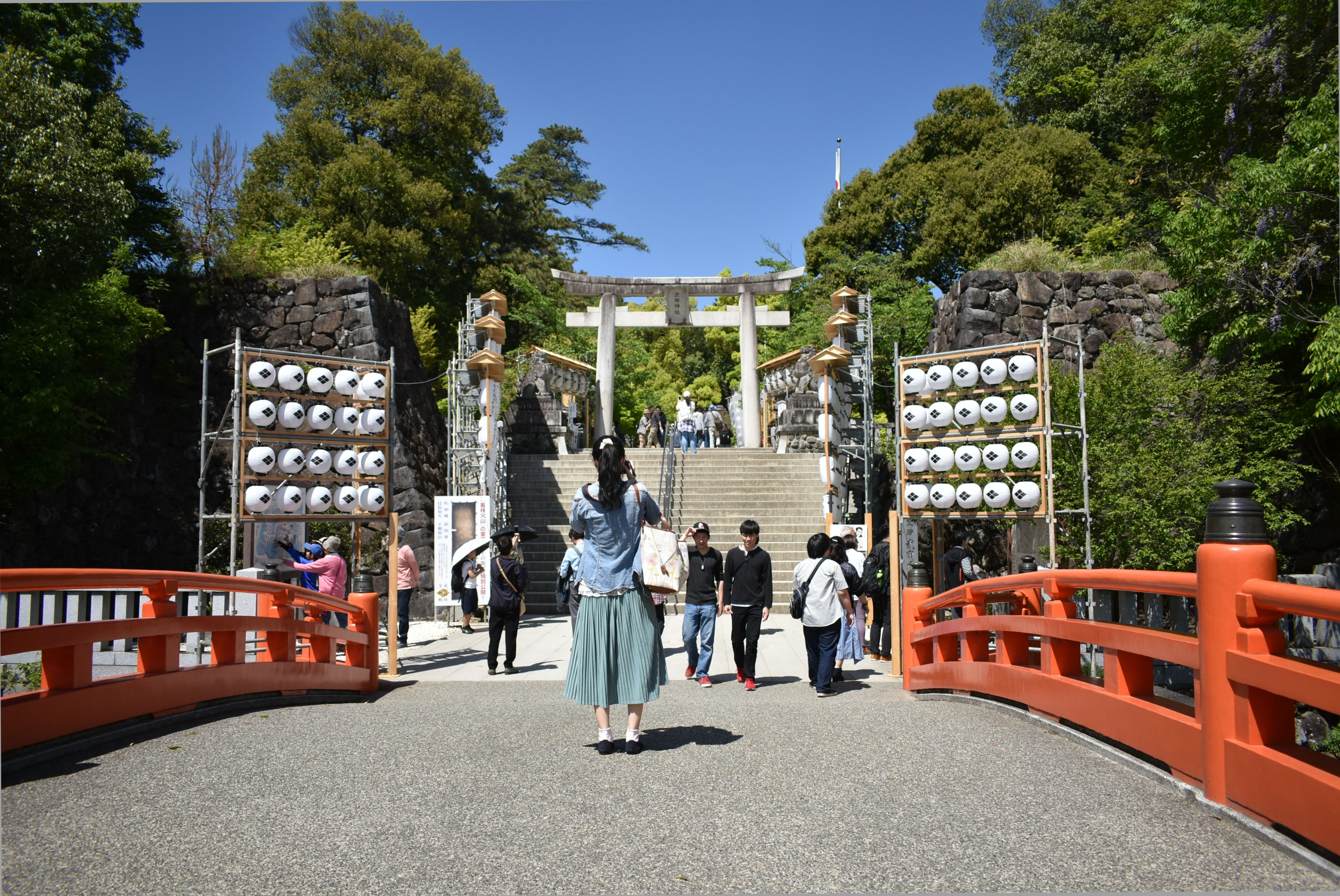
Tsutsujigasaki Castle (2019)
(Takeda Shrine)

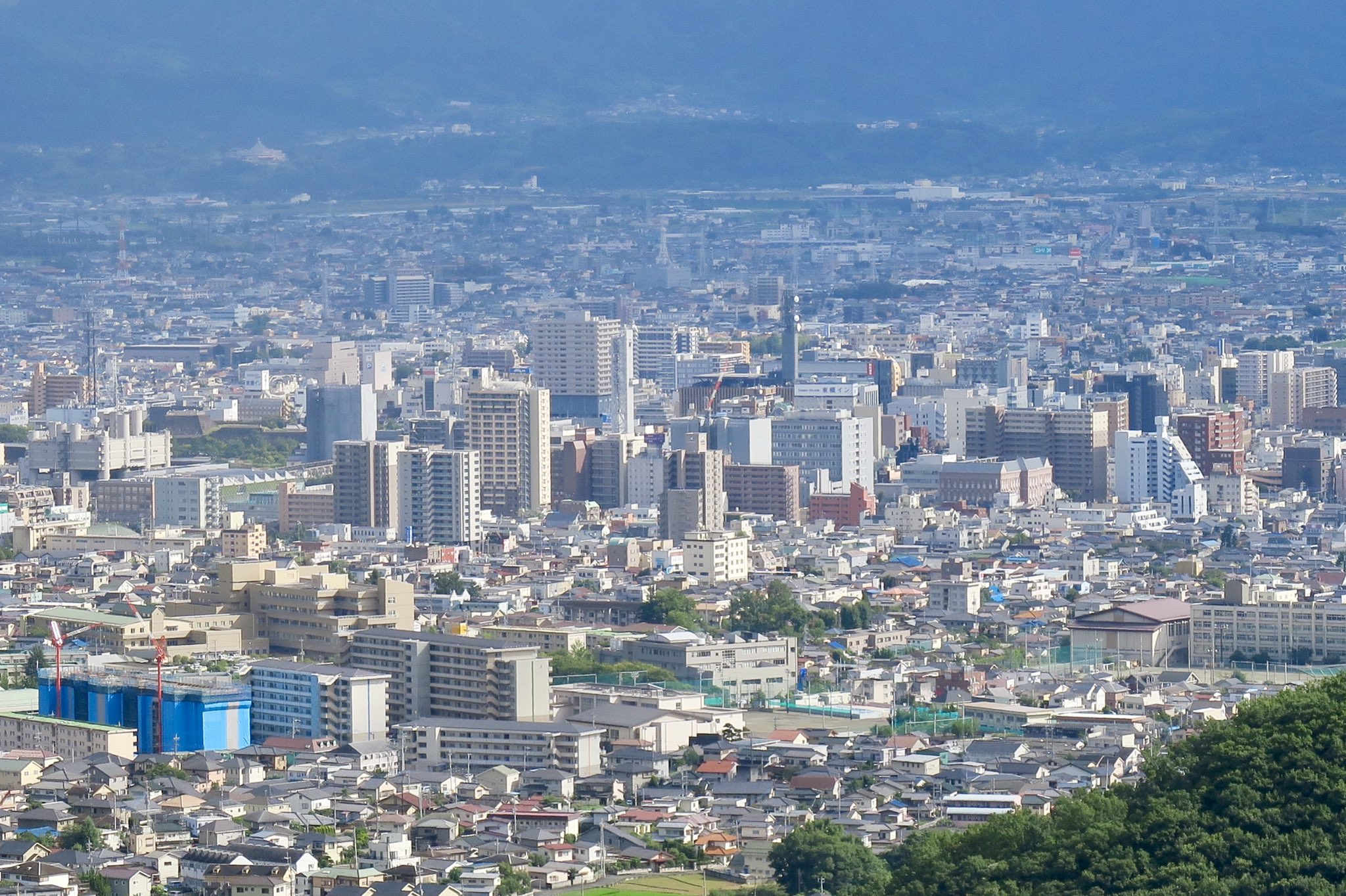
Skyline of Kōfu City (2018)

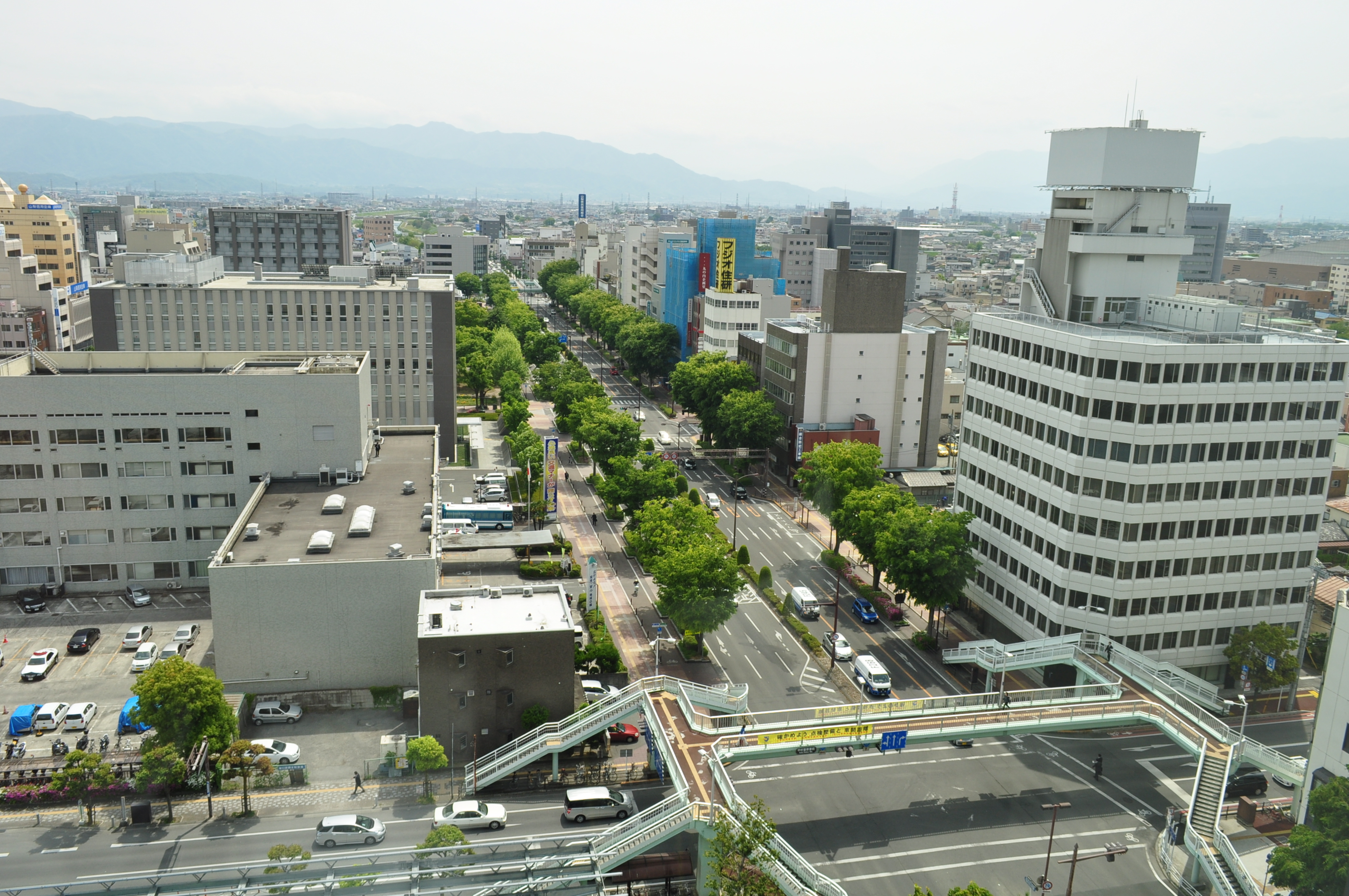
CBD of Kōfu City (2014)

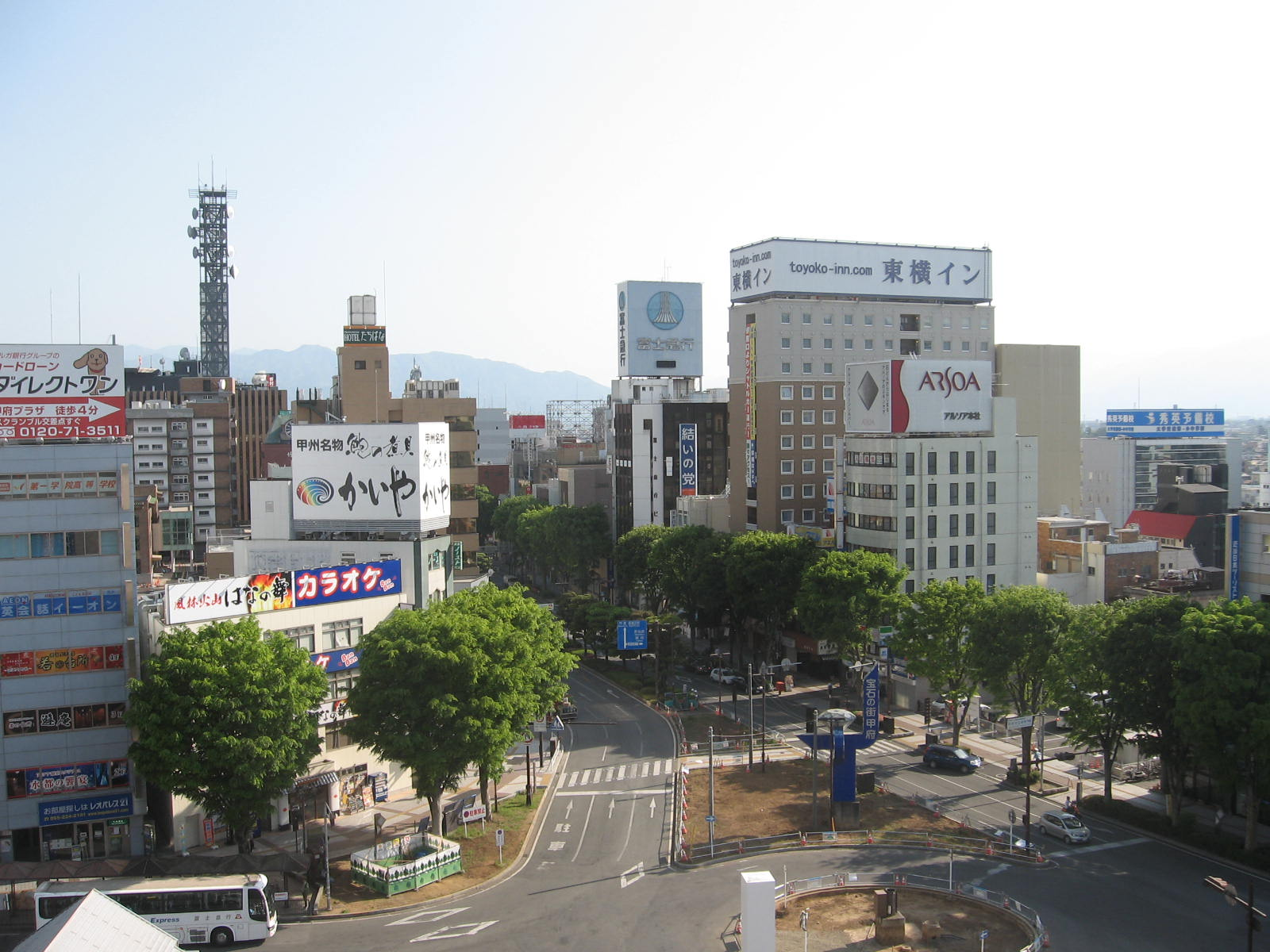
Downtown of Kōfu City (2015)

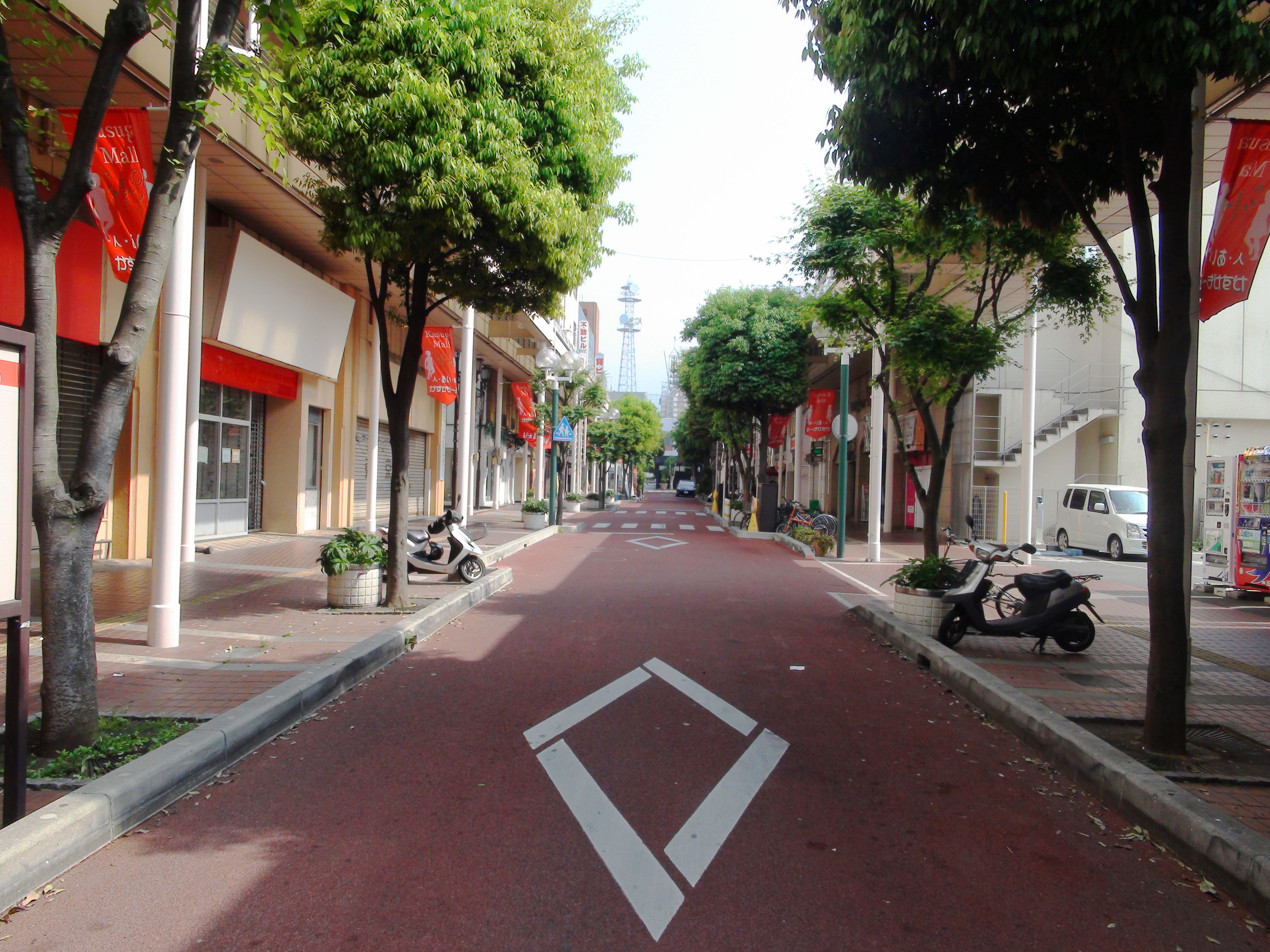
Downtown Kasuga

== Geography ==
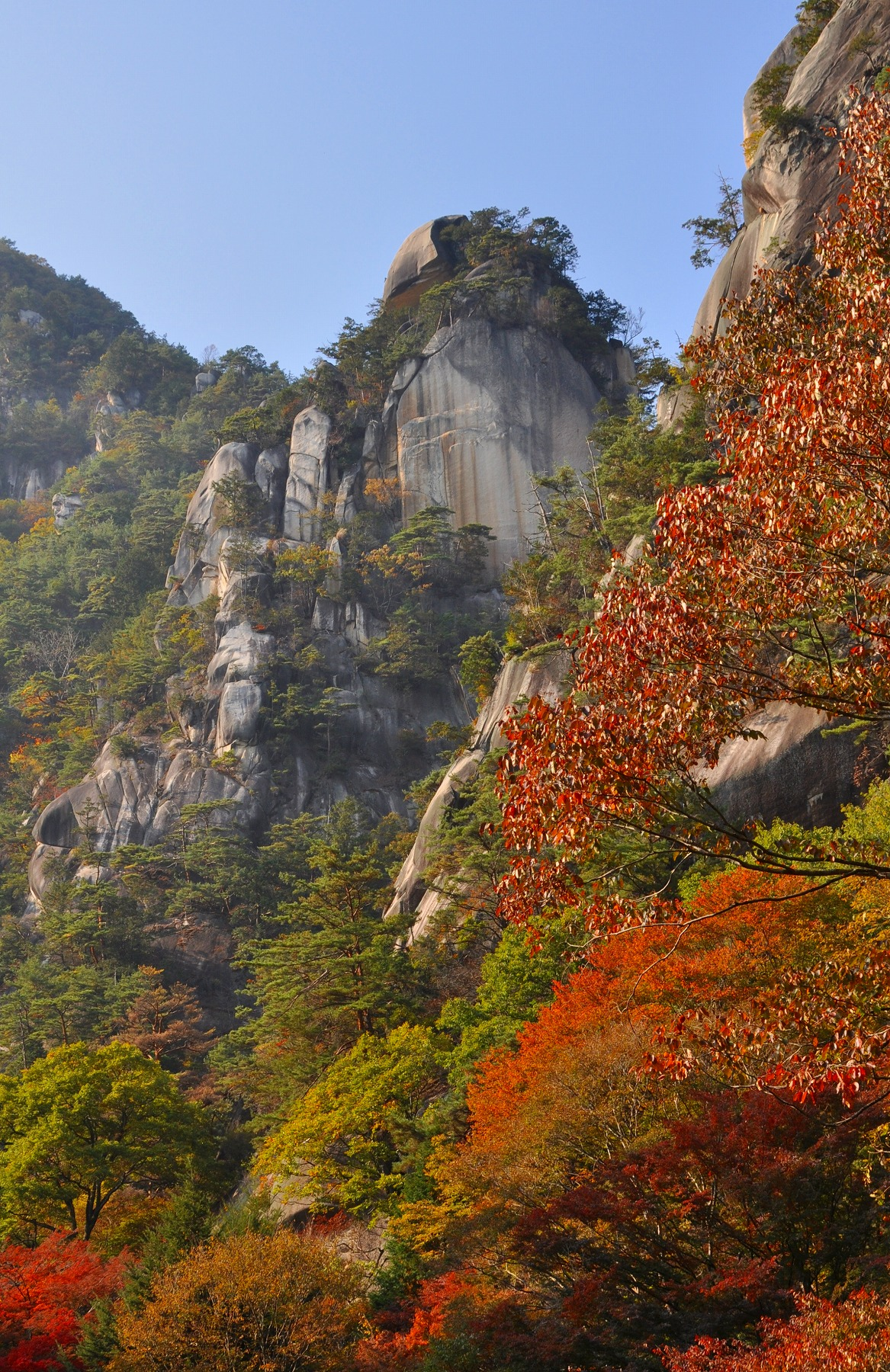
Shōsenkyō

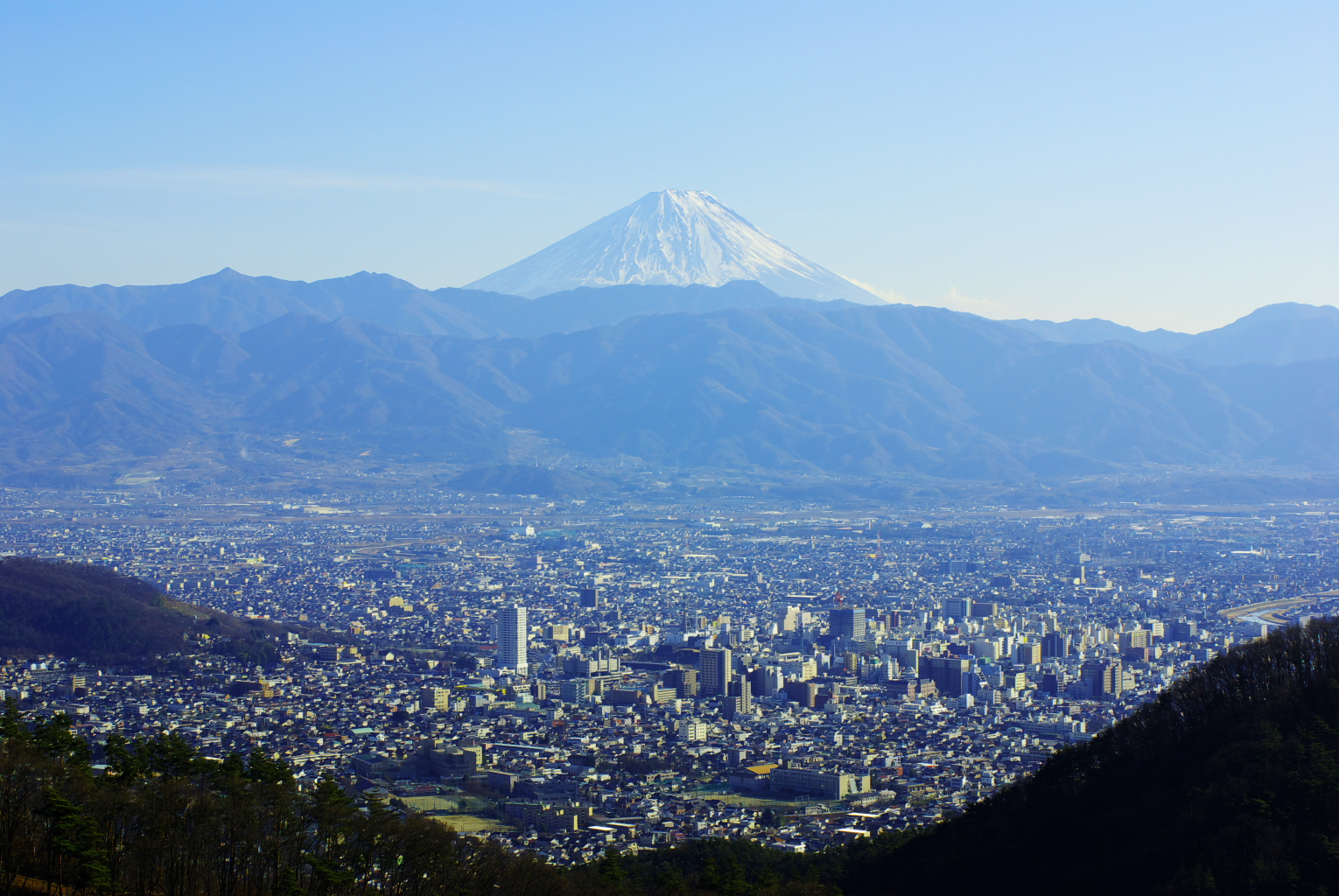
The Kōfu Basin with Kōfu City and a view of Mount Fuji

Kōfu is located in north-central Yamanashi Prefecture which is in Central Honshu. It extends from the northern border of the prefecture with Nagano Prefecture to the south until it almost reaches the prefecture's southern border. It is narrow along its east–west axis. The city bisects the Kōfu Basin and is 250 to 300 meters above sea level. Kōfu is surrounded by mountains on all sides. Three quarters of Kōfu's territory is a part of Mount Kinpu in the north. Much of the northern portion of the city is within the Chichibu Tama Kai National Park. Mount Fuji is visible in the distance from Kōfu to the south.

=== Climate ===
Kōfu has a humid subtropical climate (Cfa), though it is less wet than either the south or Sea of Japan coast due to its location in a shielded mountain valley. Temperature ranges are noticeably greater than in coastal regions: in 2004 Kōfu reached a temperature of 40 °C (104 °F) previously almost unknown in Japan, and it has fallen below 0 °C (32 °F) as early as 26 October, which is about a month before the earliest freezing temperatures in such coastal cities as Kanazawa or Tokyo.

Climate data for Kōfu (1991−2020 normals, extremes 1894−present)
Month	Jan	Feb	Mar	Apr	May	Jun	Jul	Aug	Sep	Oct	Nov	Dec	Year
Record high °C (°F)	20.2 (68.4)	25.4 (77.7)	28.8 (83.8)	33.1 (91.6)	35.2 (95.4)	38.3 (100.9)	40.4 (104.7)	40.7 (105.3)	38.4 (101.1)	33.8 (92.8)	29.6 (85.3)	24.9 (76.8)	40.7 (105.3)
Mean maximum °C (°F)	14.4 (57.9)	18.9 (66.0)	23.2 (73.8)	28.3 (82.9)	31.9 (89.4)	33.9 (93.0)	37.2 (99.0)	37.4 (99.3)	34.7 (94.5)	29.3 (84.7)	23.0 (73.4)	17.7 (63.9)	38.0 (100.4)
Mean daily maximum °C (°F)	9.1 (48.4)	10.9 (51.6)	15.0 (59.0)	20.7 (69.3)	25.3 (77.5)	27.8 (82.0)	31.6 (88.9)	33.0 (91.4)	28.6 (83.5)	22.5 (72.5)	16.7 (62.1)	11.4 (52.5)	21.0 (69.8)
Daily mean °C (°F)	3.1 (37.6)	4.7 (40.5)	8.6 (47.5)	14.0 (57.2)	18.8 (65.8)	22.3 (72.1)	26.0 (78.8)	27.1 (80.8)	23.2 (73.8)	17.1 (62.8)	10.8 (51.4)	5.4 (41.7)	15.1 (59.2)
Mean daily minimum °C (°F)	−2.1 (28.2)	−0.7 (30.7)	3.1 (37.6)	8.4 (47.1)	13.7 (56.7)	18.3 (64.9)	22.3 (72.1)	23.3 (73.9)	19.4 (66.9)	13.0 (55.4)	5.9 (42.6)	0.3 (32.5)	10.4 (50.7)
Mean minimum °C (°F)	−6.3 (20.7)	−5.8 (21.6)	−2.8 (27.0)	1.3 (34.3)	7.7 (45.9)	13.3 (55.9)	18.9 (66.0)	19.5 (67.1)	12.9 (55.2)	6.2 (43.2)	−0.1 (31.8)	−4.6 (23.7)	−6.8 (19.8)
Record low °C (°F)	−19.5 (−3.1)	−17.2 (1.0)	−11.4 (11.5)	−4.6 (23.7)	−0.6 (30.9)	5.4 (41.7)	12.6 (54.7)	13.2 (55.8)	6.0 (42.8)	−1.8 (28.8)	−6.0 (21.2)	−11.7 (10.9)	−19.5 (−3.1)
Average precipitation mm (inches)	42.7 (1.68)	44.1 (1.74)	86.2 (3.39)	79.5 (3.13)	85.4 (3.36)	113.4 (4.46)	148.8 (5.86)	133.1 (5.24)	178.7 (7.04)	158.5 (6.24)	52.7 (2.07)	37.6 (1.48)	1,160.7 (45.70)
Average snowfall cm (inches)	9 (3.5)	11 (4.3)	1 (0.4)	0 (0)	0 (0)	0 (0)	0 (0)	0 (0)	0 (0)	0 (0)	0 (0)	1 (0.4)	23 (9.1)
Average precipitation days (≥ 0.5 mm)	4.7	5.2	9.0	8.3	8.9	12.0	12.3	10.4	10.8	9.7	6.1	4.9	102.2
Average relative humidity (%)	55	52	55	57	62	69	72	70	71	71	67	60	64
Mean monthly sunshine hours	209.1	195.4	206.3	206.1	203.9	149.9	168.2	197.0	150.9	159.6	178.6	200.9	2,225.8
Source: Japan Meteorological Agency

Climate data for Furuseki, Kōfu (1991–2020 normals, extremes 1976–present)
Month	Jan	Feb	Mar	Apr	May	Jun	Jul	Aug	Sep	Oct	Nov	Dec	Year
Record high °C (°F)	15.8 (60.4)	22.8 (73.0)	26.5 (79.7)	31.0 (87.8)	33.1 (91.6)	36.6 (97.9)	38.3 (100.9)	38.6 (101.5)	36.0 (96.8)	30.7 (87.3)	25.2 (77.4)	21.8 (71.2)	38.6 (101.5)
Mean daily maximum °C (°F)	6.2 (43.2)	8.1 (46.6)	12.3 (54.1)	18.1 (64.6)	22.8 (73.0)	25.4 (77.7)	29.4 (84.9)	30.6 (87.1)	26.2 (79.2)	20.0 (68.0)	14.5 (58.1)	8.8 (47.8)	18.5 (65.3)
Daily mean °C (°F)	0.3 (32.5)	1.9 (35.4)	5.8 (42.4)	11.4 (52.5)	16.0 (60.8)	19.6 (67.3)	23.4 (74.1)	24.2 (75.6)	20.3 (68.5)	14.2 (57.6)	8.2 (46.8)	2.8 (37.0)	12.3 (54.1)
Mean daily minimum °C (°F)	−3.9 (25.0)	−3.0 (26.6)	0.4 (32.7)	5.4 (41.7)	10.4 (50.7)	15.1 (59.2)	19.1 (66.4)	19.8 (67.6)	16.1 (61.0)	10.1 (50.2)	3.8 (38.8)	−1.3 (29.7)	7.7 (45.9)
Record low °C (°F)	−11.3 (11.7)	−11.6 (11.1)	−9.6 (14.7)	−4.8 (23.4)	−0.6 (30.9)	7.9 (46.2)	11.6 (52.9)	12.2 (54.0)	5.1 (41.2)	−0.1 (31.8)	−3.4 (25.9)	−8.7 (16.3)	−11.6 (11.1)
Average precipitation mm (inches)	56.8 (2.24)	58.7 (2.31)	121.8 (4.80)	127.6 (5.02)	128.1 (5.04)	152.1 (5.99)	171.5 (6.75)	182.3 (7.18)	309.1 (12.17)	224.6 (8.84)	90.3 (3.56)	58.4 (2.30)	1,681.3 (66.19)
Average precipitation days (≥ 1.0 mm)	5.0	5.1	9.1	8.5	9.5	11.2	11.0	9.3	11.0	10.0	6.5	4.8	100.9
Mean monthly sunshine hours	169.0	162.9	183.2	198.2	205.1	151.0	168.9	195.1	137.6	132.8	142.3	159.1	2,004.8
Source 1: Japan Meteorological Agency
Source 2: Japan Meteorological Agency

甲府

Climate chart (precipitation, max. and min. temperature)
J	F	M	A	M	J	J	A	S	O	N	D
43 9 −2	44 11 −1	86 15 3	80 21 8	85 25 14	113 28 18	149 32 22	133 33 23	179 29 19	159 23 13	53 17 6	38 11 0
- █ Average max. and min. temperatures in °C
- █ Precipitation totals in mm
- Source: 気象庁
Imperial conversion
J	F	M	A	M	J	J	A	S	O	N	D
1.7 48 28	1.7 52 31	3.4 59 38	3.1 69 47	3.4 78 57	4.5 82 65	5.9 89 72	5.2 91 74	7 83 67	6.2 73 55	2.1 62 43	1.5 53 33
- █ Average max. and min. temperatures in °F
- █ Precipitation totals in inches

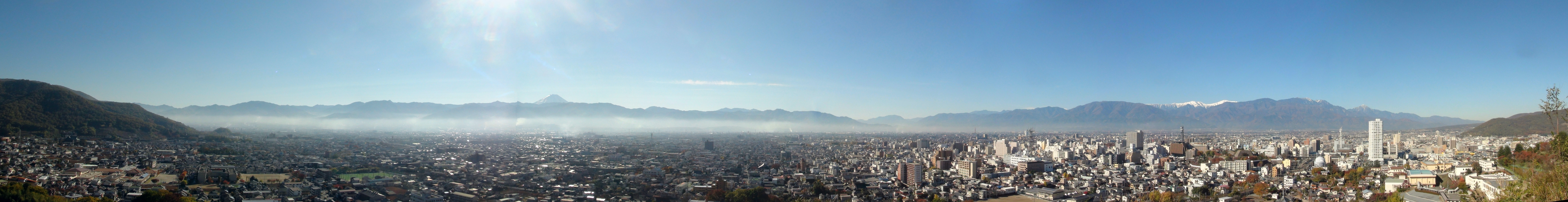
An overview of Kofu city from Mount Atago. The left end is east and the right end is west. Mount Atago at the shooting point is located at the southern end of the Oku Chichibu Massif. Mount Fuji over Mount Misaka, the Southern Alps soars to the west, and it is surrounded by a 360-degree mountain area. A panorama photo taken in November 2013.

=== Surrounding municipalities ===
Nagano Prefecture

- Kawakami

Yamanashi Prefecture

- Chūō
- Fuefuki
- Fujikawaguchiko
- Hokuto
- Ichikawamisato
- Kai
- Minobu
- Shōwa
- Yamanashi

== Demographics ==
Per Japanese census data, the population of Kōfu has remained relatively stable over the past 50 years.

Historical population
Year	Pop.	±%
1940	102,419	—
1950	121,645	+18.8%
1960	160,963	+32.3%
1970	182,669	+13.5%
1980	199,262	+9.1%
1990	200,626	+0.7%
2000	196,154	−2.2%
2010	198,992	+1.4%
2020	189,591	−4.7%

== History ==
=== Prehistoric ages ===
Archaeologists have discovered evidence of human settlement in the Kōfu area dating to the Japanese Paleolithic period, with continuous settlement through the Jōmon, Yayoi and Kofun periods.

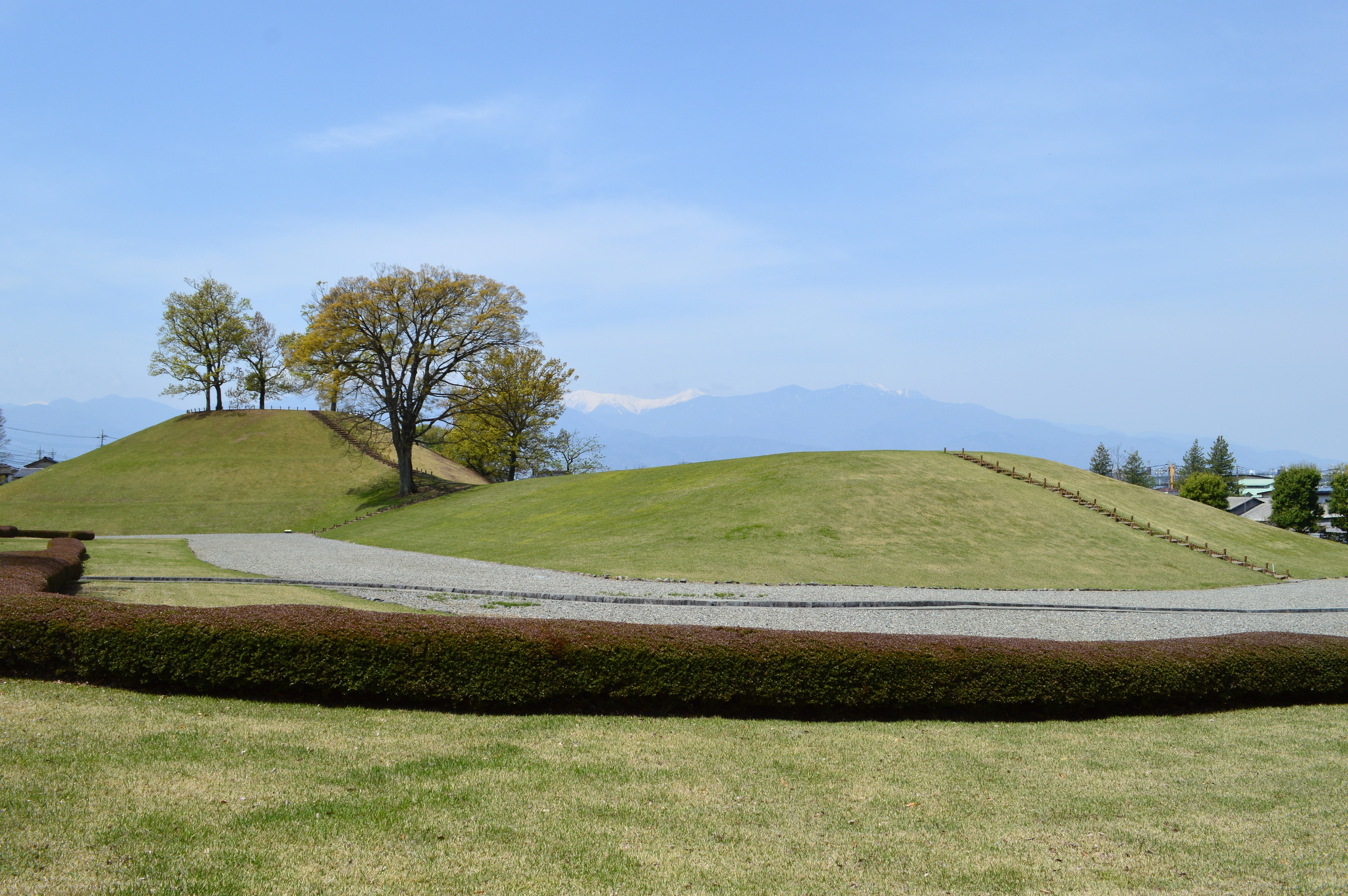
Kai Chōshizuka Kofun

=== Ancient ages ===
During the Nara period, the provincial temple of Kai Province was established in what is now Kōfu, indicating that the Nara period provincial capital was located nearby, as the name of the city implies.

During the Heian period, a branch of the Minamoto clan, the "Kai-Genji" ruled over vast shōen estates, and developed a military force noted for its use of cavalry.

=== Feudal period ===
By the Muromachi period, a branch of the Kai-Genji, the Takeda clan came to dominate the area, and built a castle in what is now part of Kōfu.

Under the rule of Takeda Nobutora, Kōfu was rebuilt as a castle town starting in 1519, and remained the capital of the Takeda clan under Takeda Shingen and his son Takeda Katsuyori.

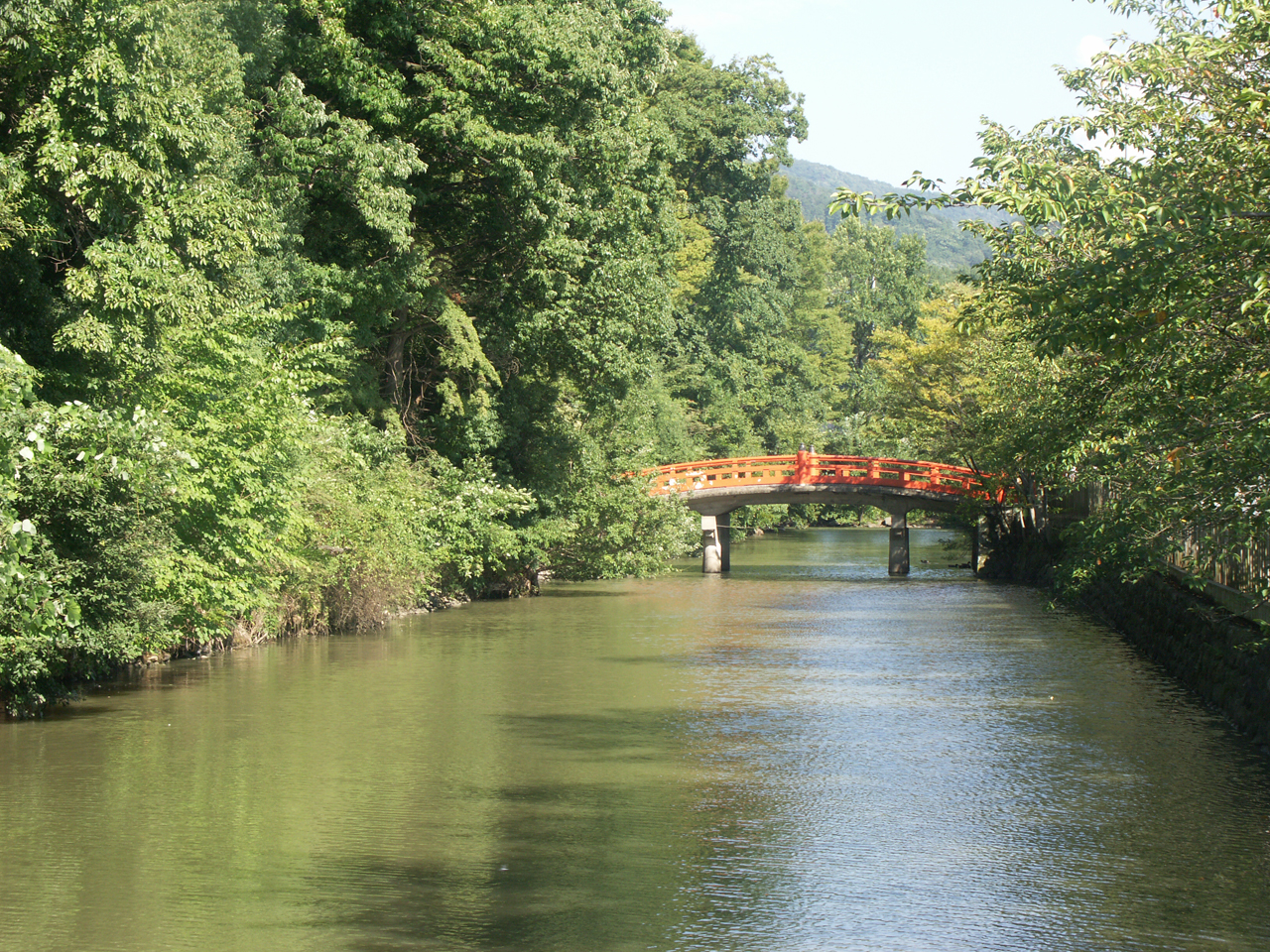
Tsutsujigasaki Castle

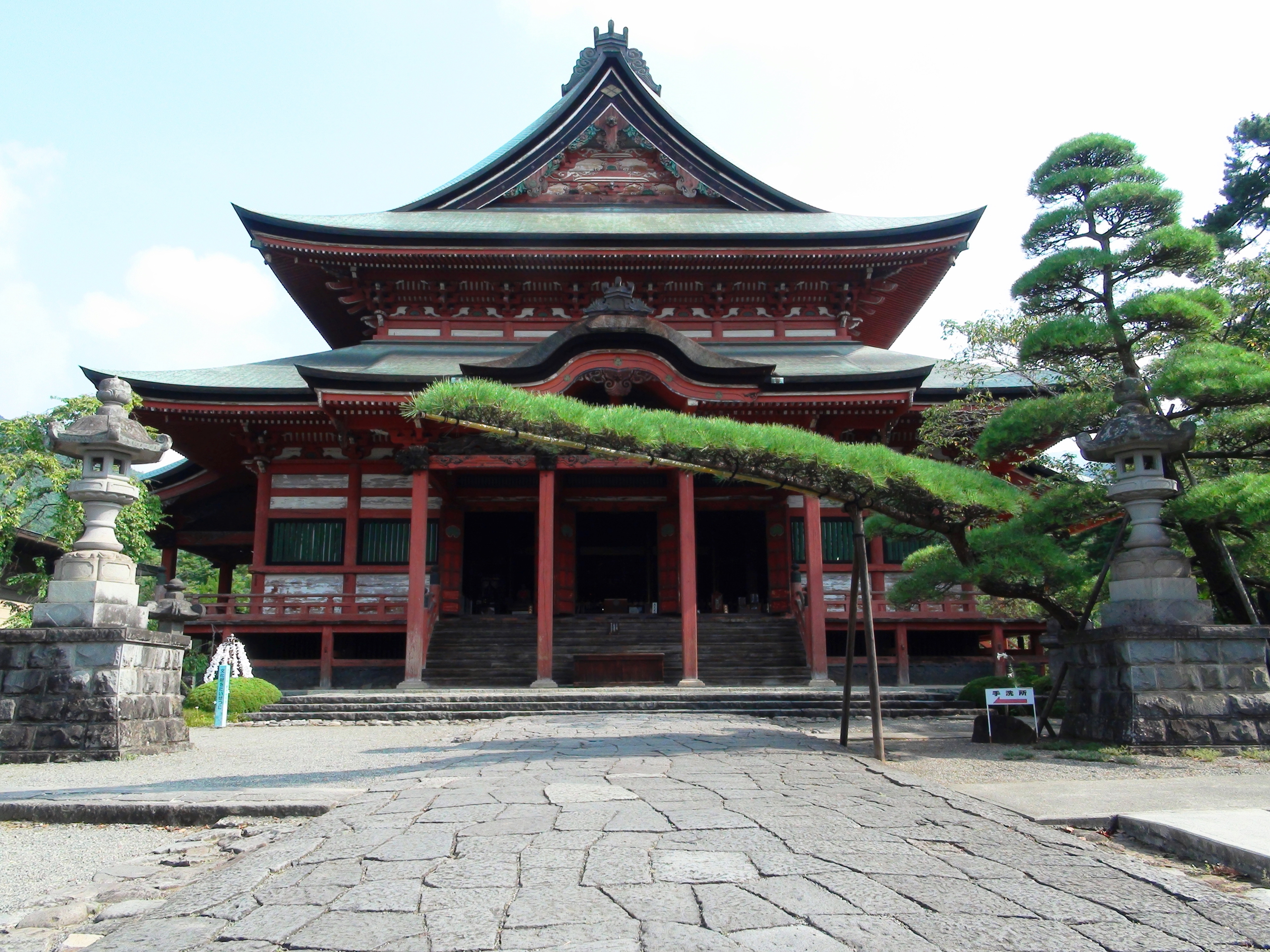
Kai Zenkō-ji

=== Early modern ages ===
During the Edo period, Kai Province was tenryō territory ruled directly by the Tokugawa shogunate, and Kōfu Castle remained its administrative center. In 1705, in a signal honour, it was conferred on Yanagisawa Yoshiyasu a favourite of the fifth shōgun. He was a member of the Yanagisawa clan descendants of the "Kai-Genji", the branch of the Minamoto clan which had been enfeoffed with the province of Kai in the eleventh century. His son, Yoshiyasu was transferred to Yamato-Koriyama Castle in 1724 after which Kofu Castle was again held directly by the Shogunate.

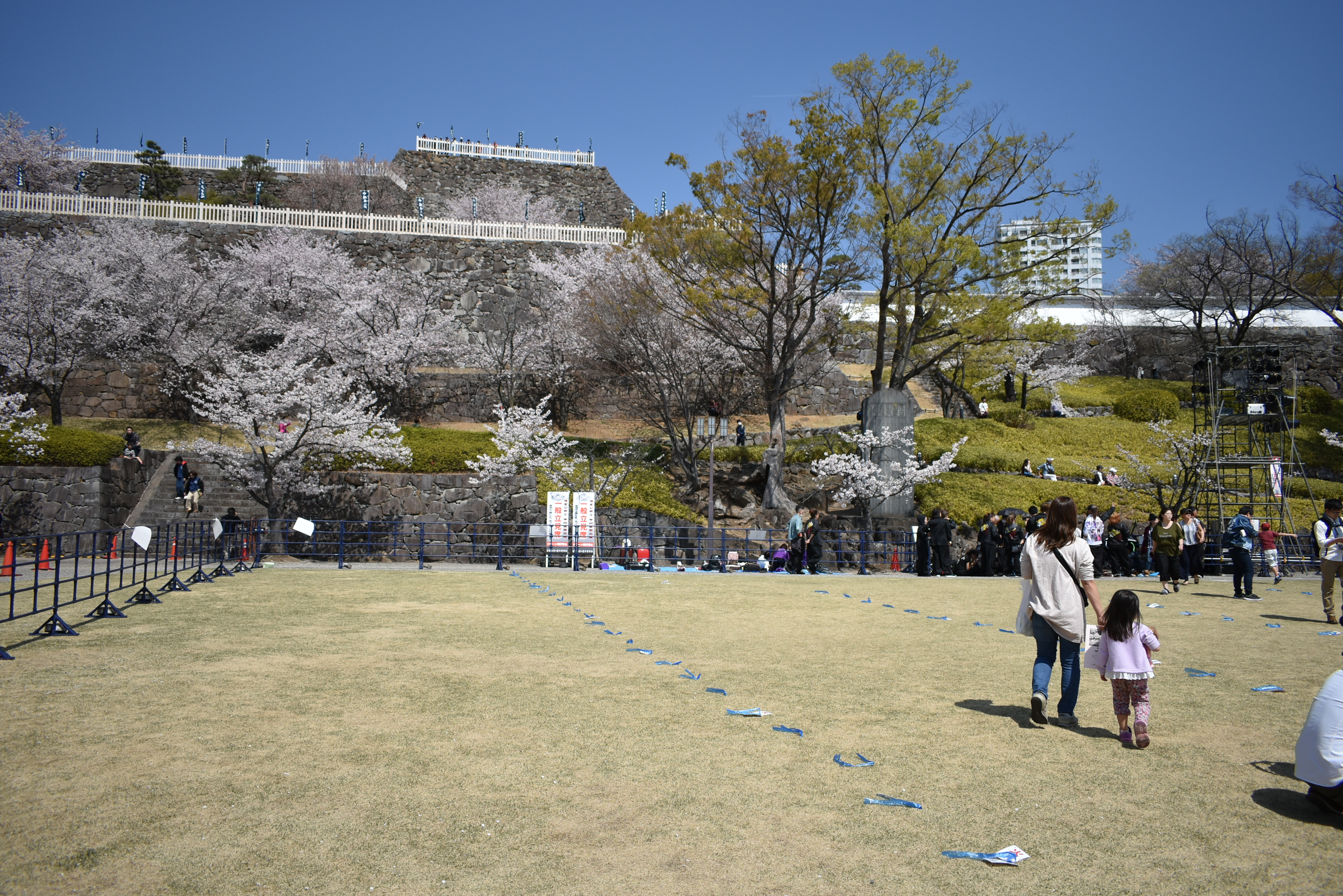
Kōfu Castle

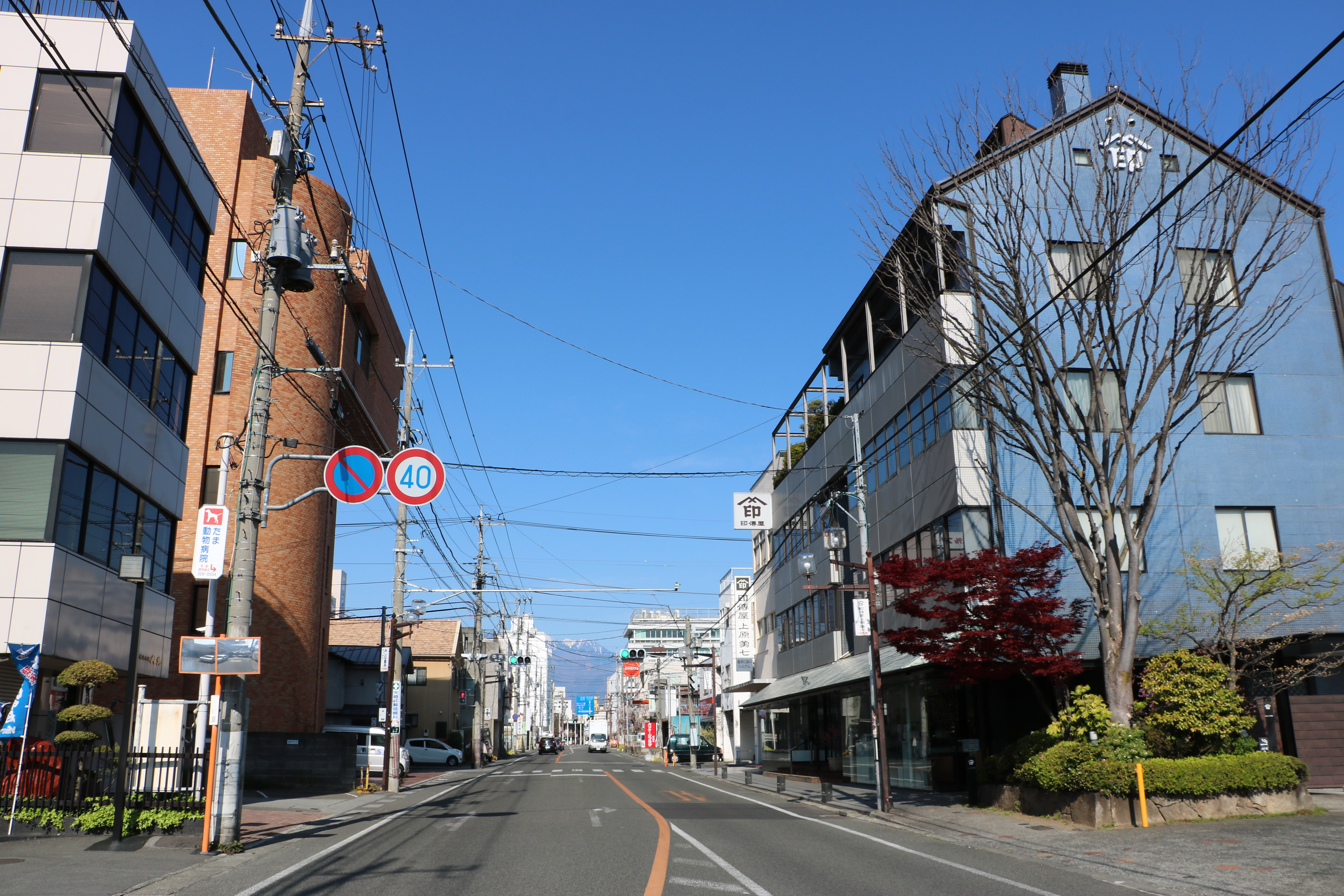
Kōshū Kaidō (Kōfu-shuku)

=== Late modern ages ===
Following the Meiji restoration, with the establishment of the modern municipalities system, the town of Kōfu was proclaimed on July 1, 1889.

The city experienced a major flood disaster in 1907 (明治40年の大水害) caused by heavy rain in a typhoon from the night of August 21, 1907 and by deforestation which was accelerated in Yamanashi Prefecture, due to the need for wood for fuel of the steam engines of the growing industrial policy of the Fujimura Prefectural Government. A police officer inspected the stricken area from August 23 to October 10, 1907. Patrol diaries of Masaki Tsukasa Kasaburo said "This heavy rainfall causes rivers to run down, landslides and levee failures, bridge piers destruction, etc., resulting in the destruction of homes and villages, village isolation, runoff, and traffic disruptions caused serious damage 233 people died, 5757 houses were run out, 650 hectares of lands have been buried or run down, 3353 landslides, collapse and damage distance of about 140 kilometers of levees, runoff and burial of roads, the damage distance was about 500 kilometers, 393 telephone poles collapsed. It was the largest natural disaster in modern times in Yamanashi Prefecture.

During World War II, much of the city was destroyed by United States Army Air Forces B-29 Superfortress bombers during a major air raid during the night of 6 July 1945.

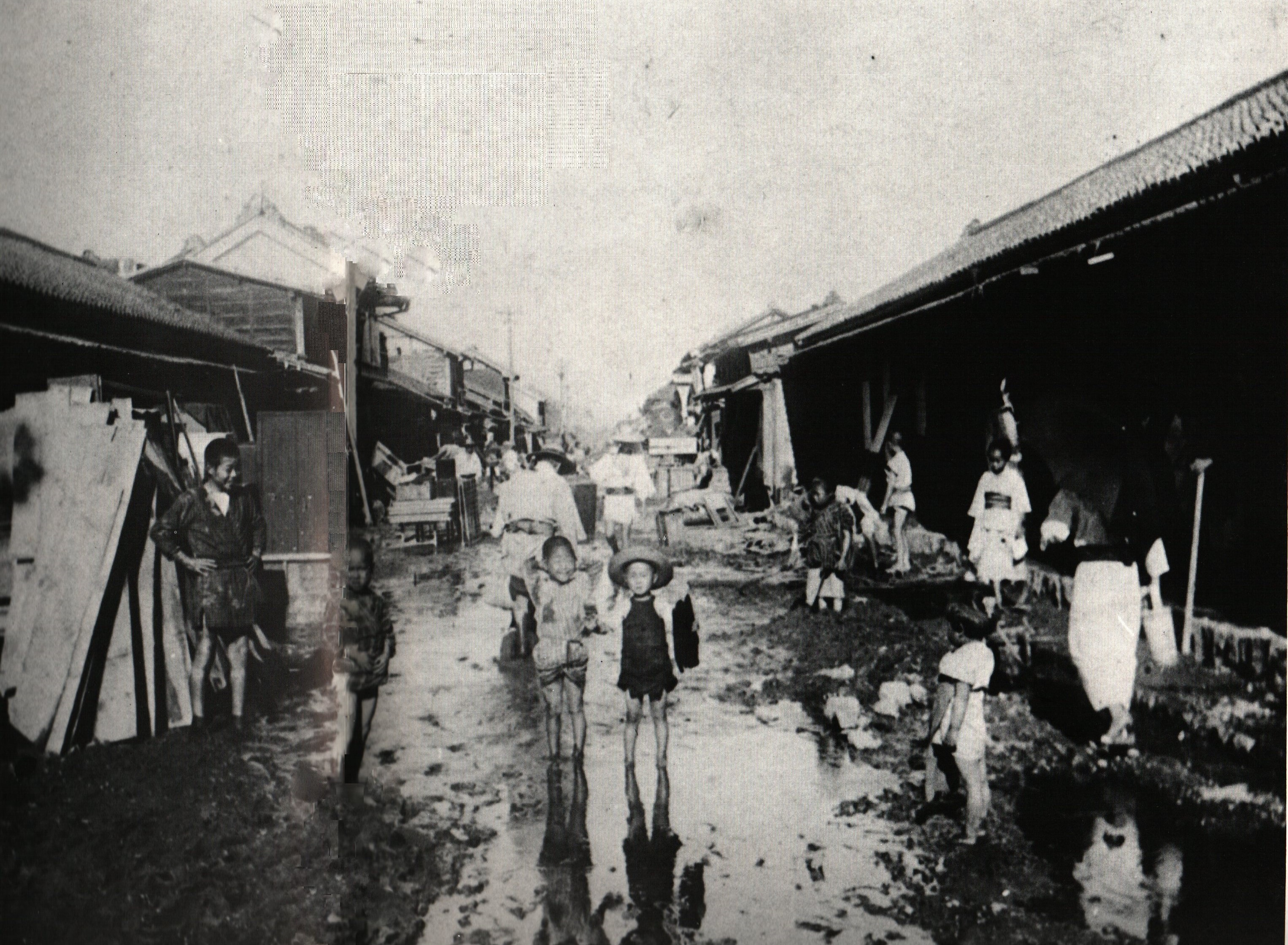
1907 Kōfu Flood

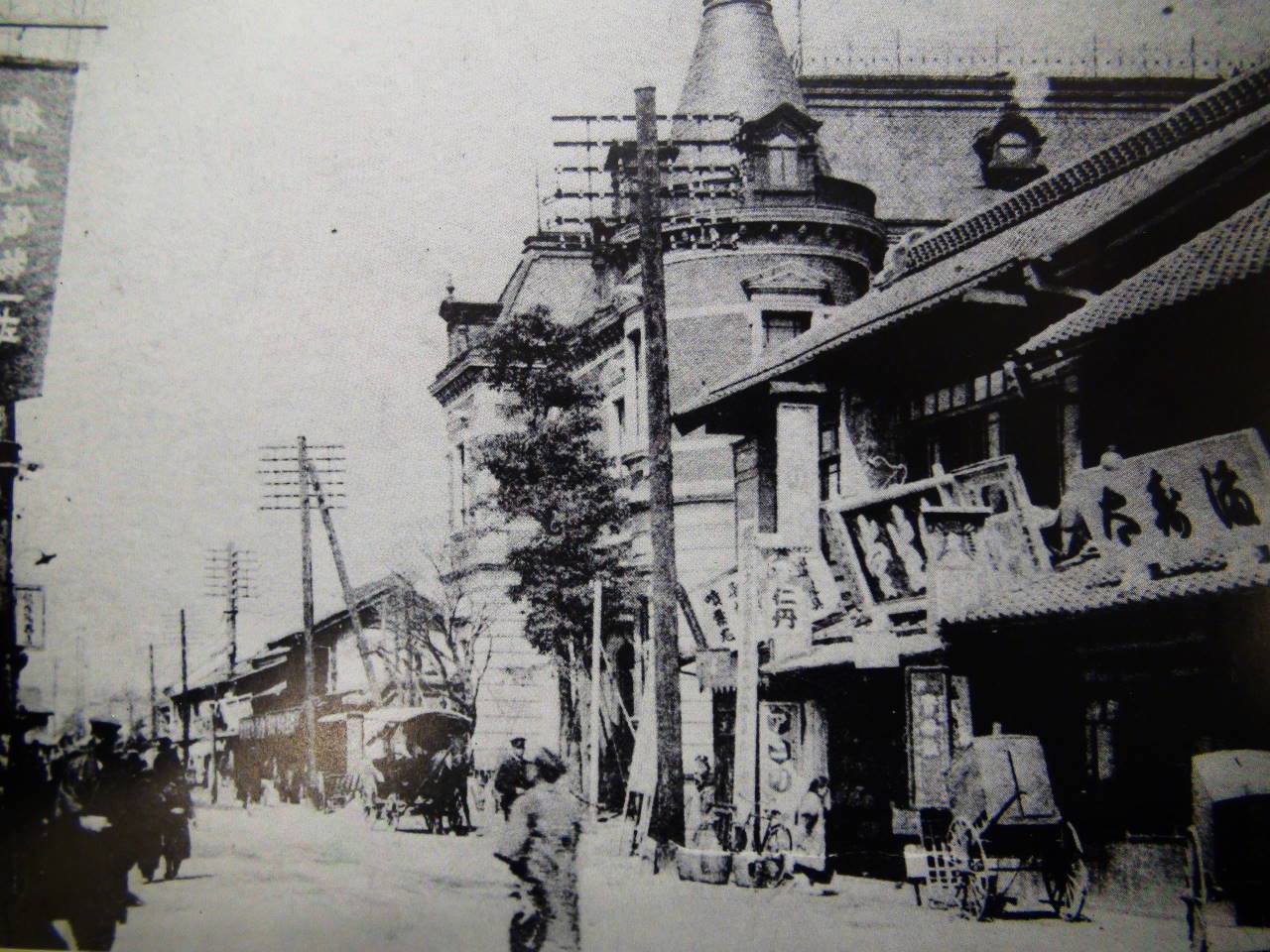
1912 Yoka-Machi Street

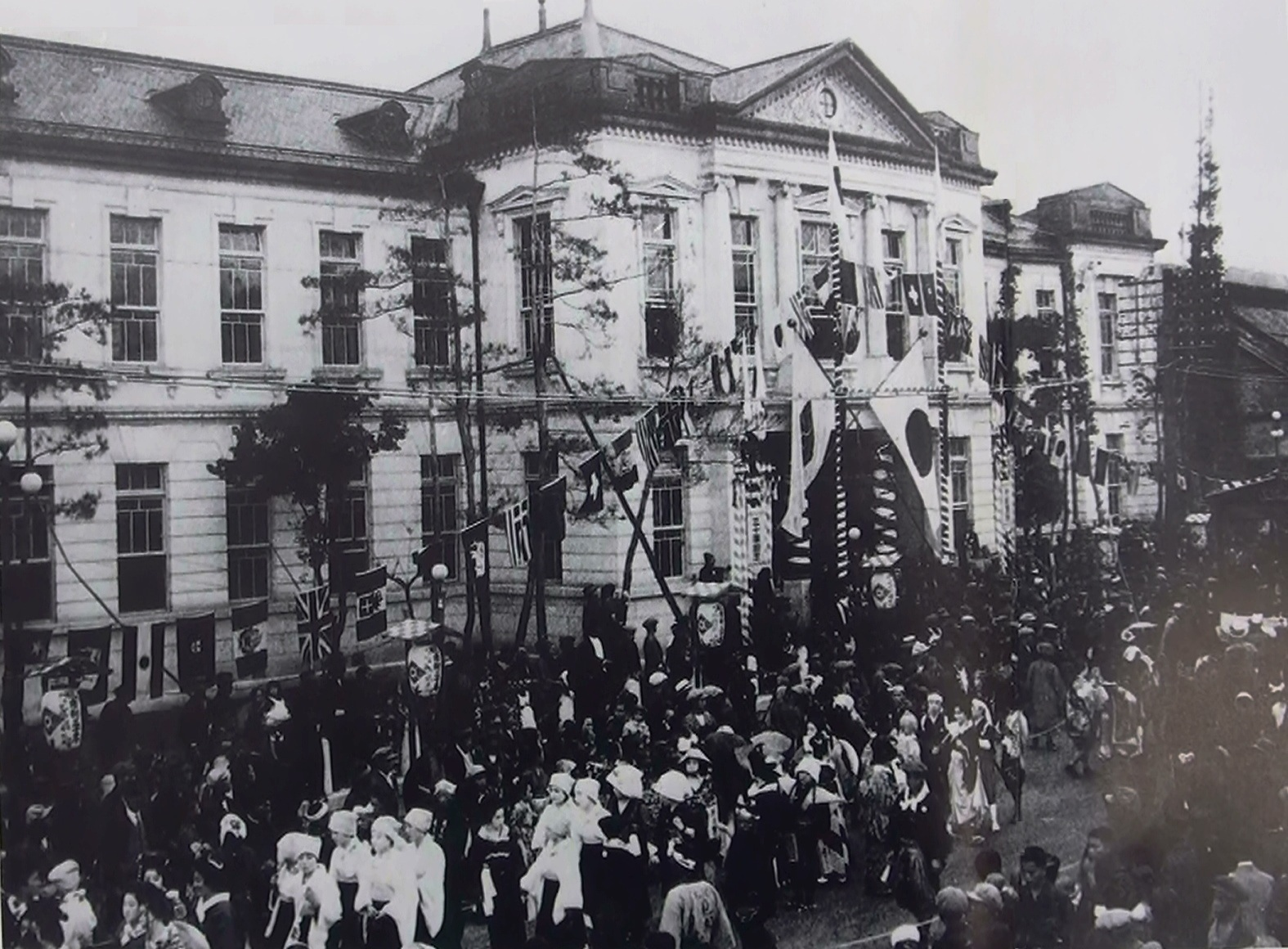
1918 Kōfu city hall building

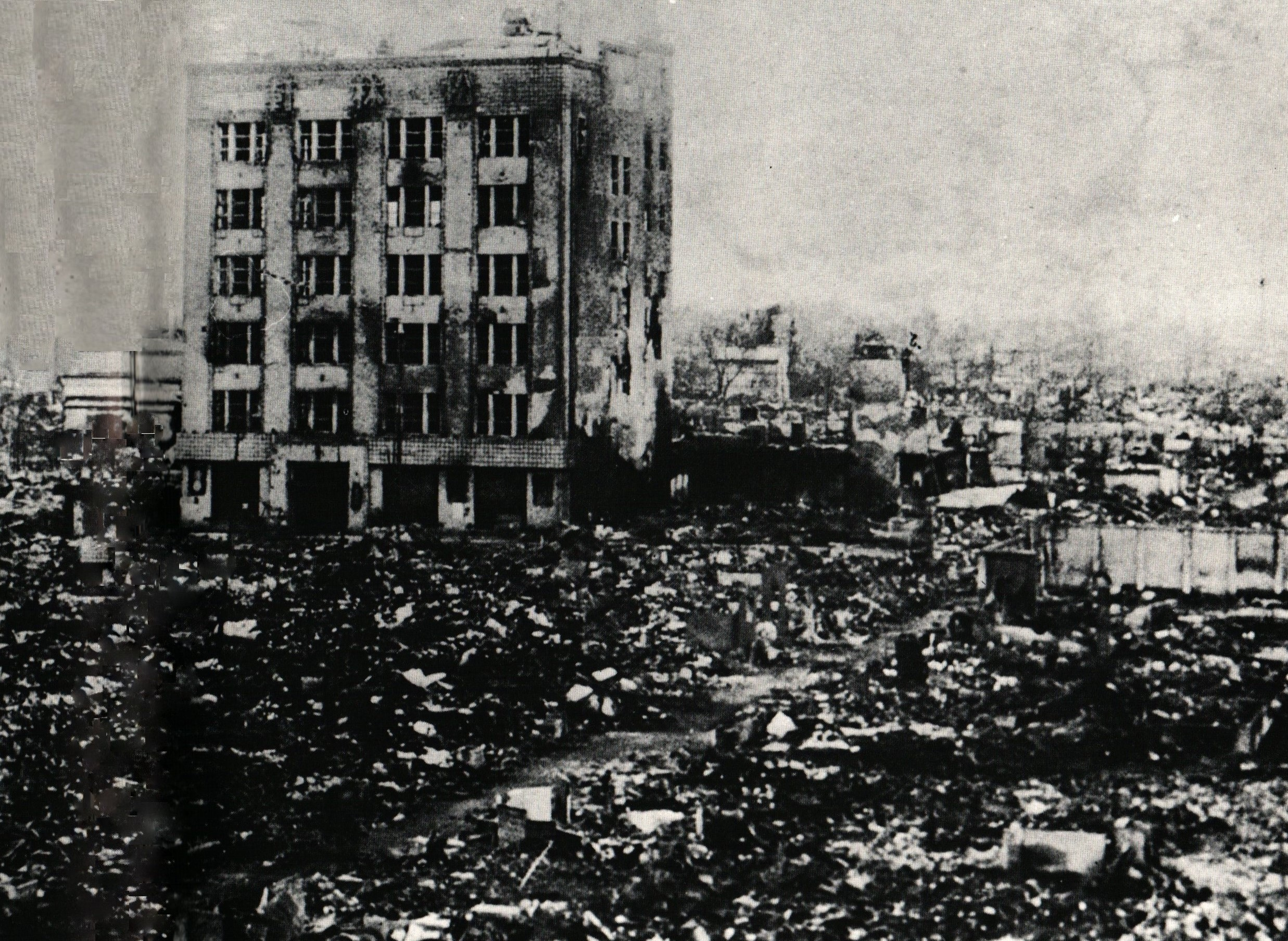
Kōfu after the 1945 air raids (Bombing of Kōfu in World War II)

=== Contemporary ages ===
Kōfu was designated as one of the special cities of Japan on April 1, 2000. On March 1, 2006, Kōfu, with a population of 193,795, absorbed the town of Nakamichi (from Higashiyatsushiro District), and the northern part of the village of Kamikuishiki (from Nishiyatsushiro District) increasing the population to 201,184.

On April 1, 2019, Kōfu's city status was elevated to a core city.

== Government ==
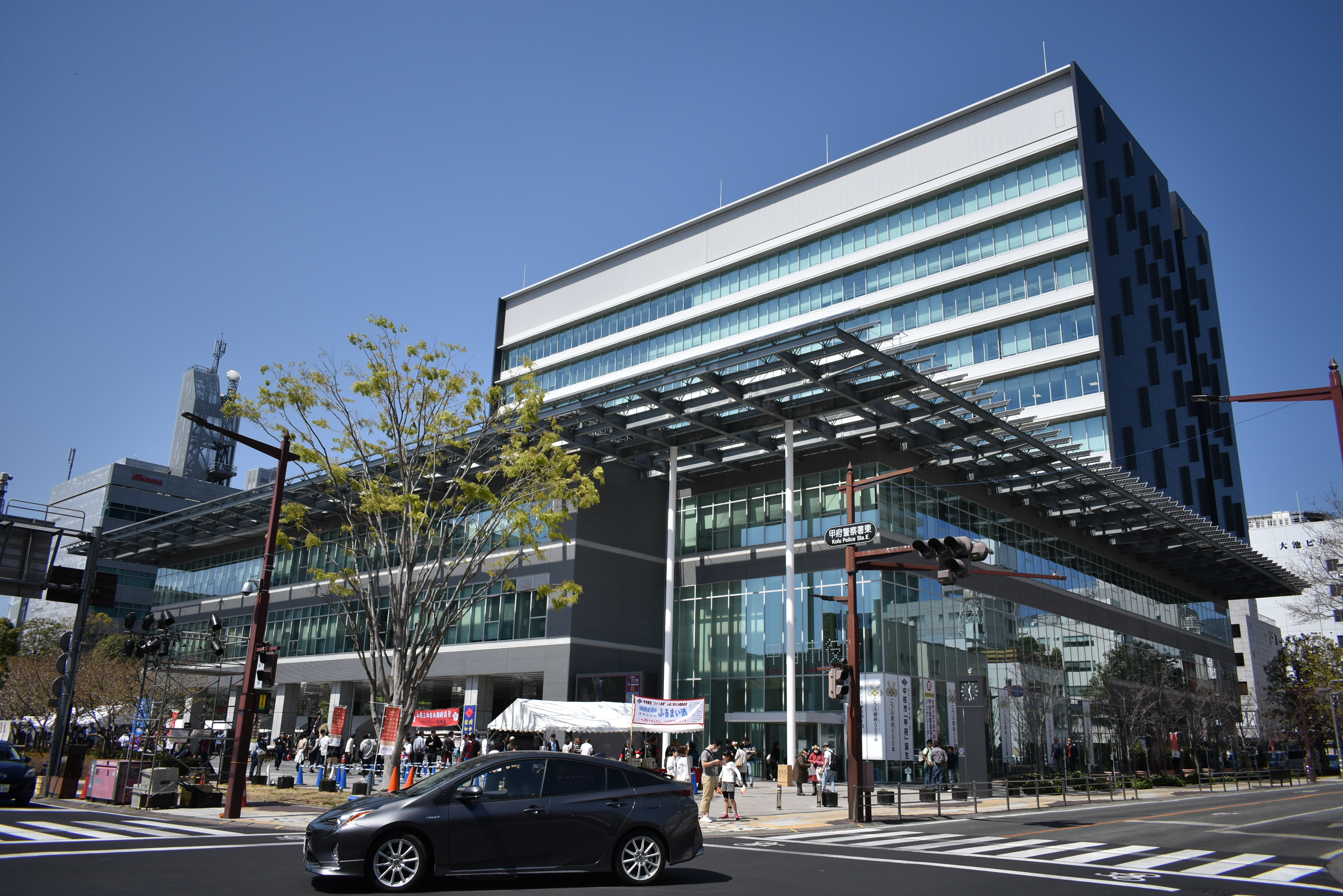
Kōfu City Hall

=== Council ===
Kōfu has a mayor-council form of government with a directly elected mayor and a unicameral city legislature of 32 members. The city supplies nine members to the Yamanashi Prefectural Assembly. In terms of national politics, the city is divided between the Yamanashi 1st district and the Yamanashi 2nd district for the House of Representatives, the lower house of the National Diet of Japan.

== Sister cities ==
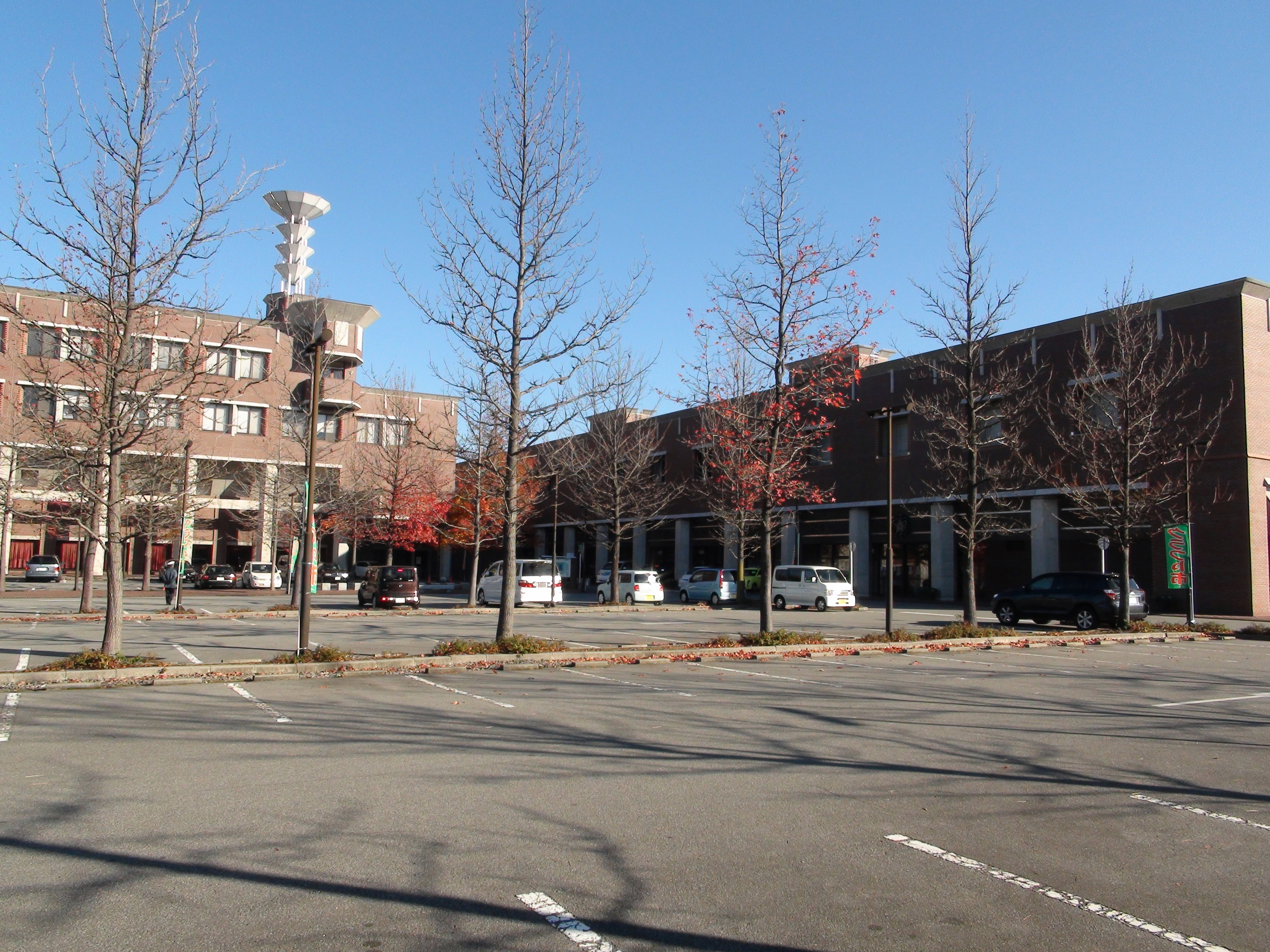
I messe Yamanashi

=== International ===
City	Country	State	Since
Des Moines	United States	Iowa	August 16, 1958
Lodi	United States	California	April 11, 1961
Pau	France	Nouvelle-Aquitaine	August 18, 1975
Chengdu	China	Sichuan	September 27, 1984
Cheongju	South Korea	North Chungcheong	September 26, 2002

=== National ===
City	Prefecture	region	Since
Yamatokōriyama	Nara	Kansai region	January 22, 1992

== Economy ==
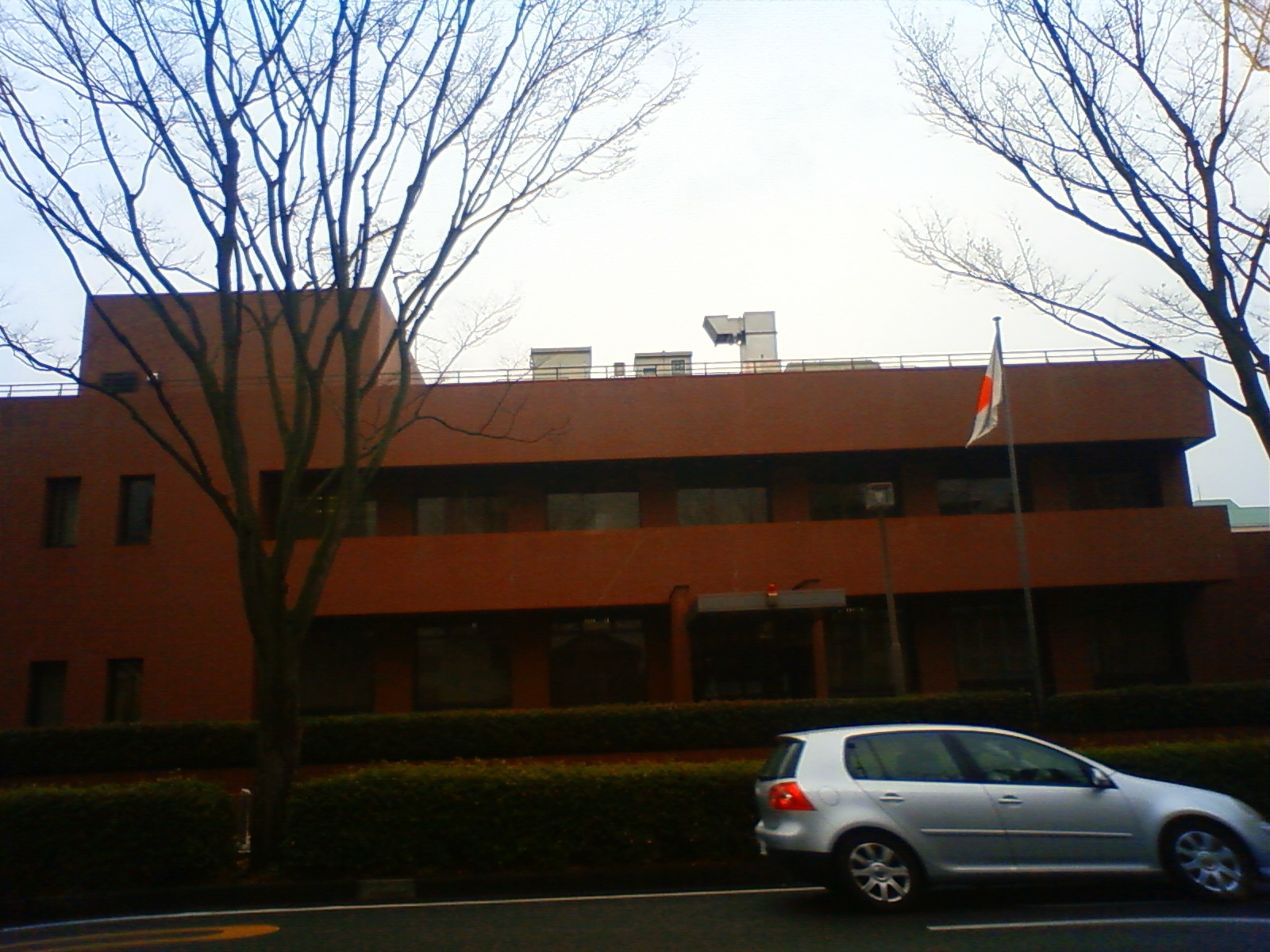
Bank of Japan Kōfu branch

The city is a regional commercial and transportation center for central Yamanashi Prefecture. Local industries include food processing including wine production, textiles and crystalware.

== Media ==
- Yamanashi Broadcasting System
- UHF Television Yamanashi

== Education ==
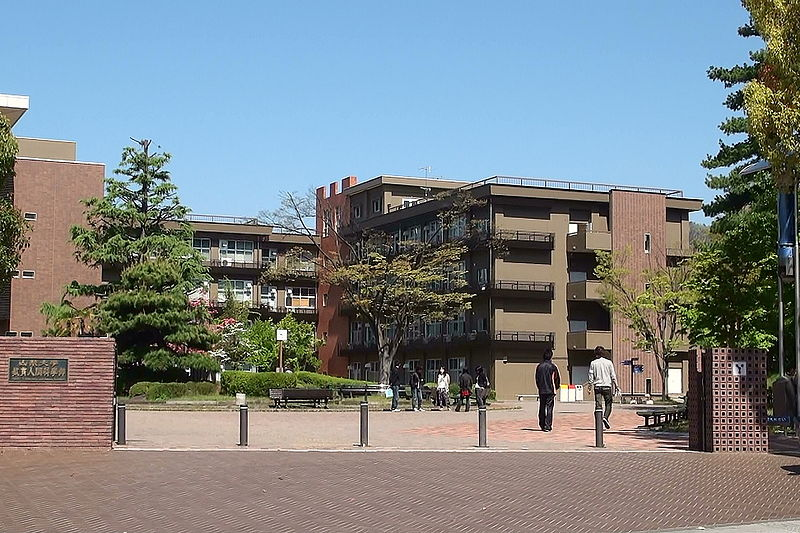
University of Yamanashi

=== Universities and colleges ===
Public

- University of Yamanashi
- Yamanashi Prefectural University

Private

- Yamanashi Eiwa College
- Yamanashi Gakuin Junior College
- Yamanashi Gakuin University

=== Primary and secondary education ===
- Kōfu has 25 public elementary schools and 11 public junior high schools operated by the city government, as well as one national combined elementary/middle school. In addition, there are two private elementary schools and three private junior high schools. The city has eight public high schools operated by the Yamanashi Prefectural Board of Education, and five private high schools.

== Transportation ==
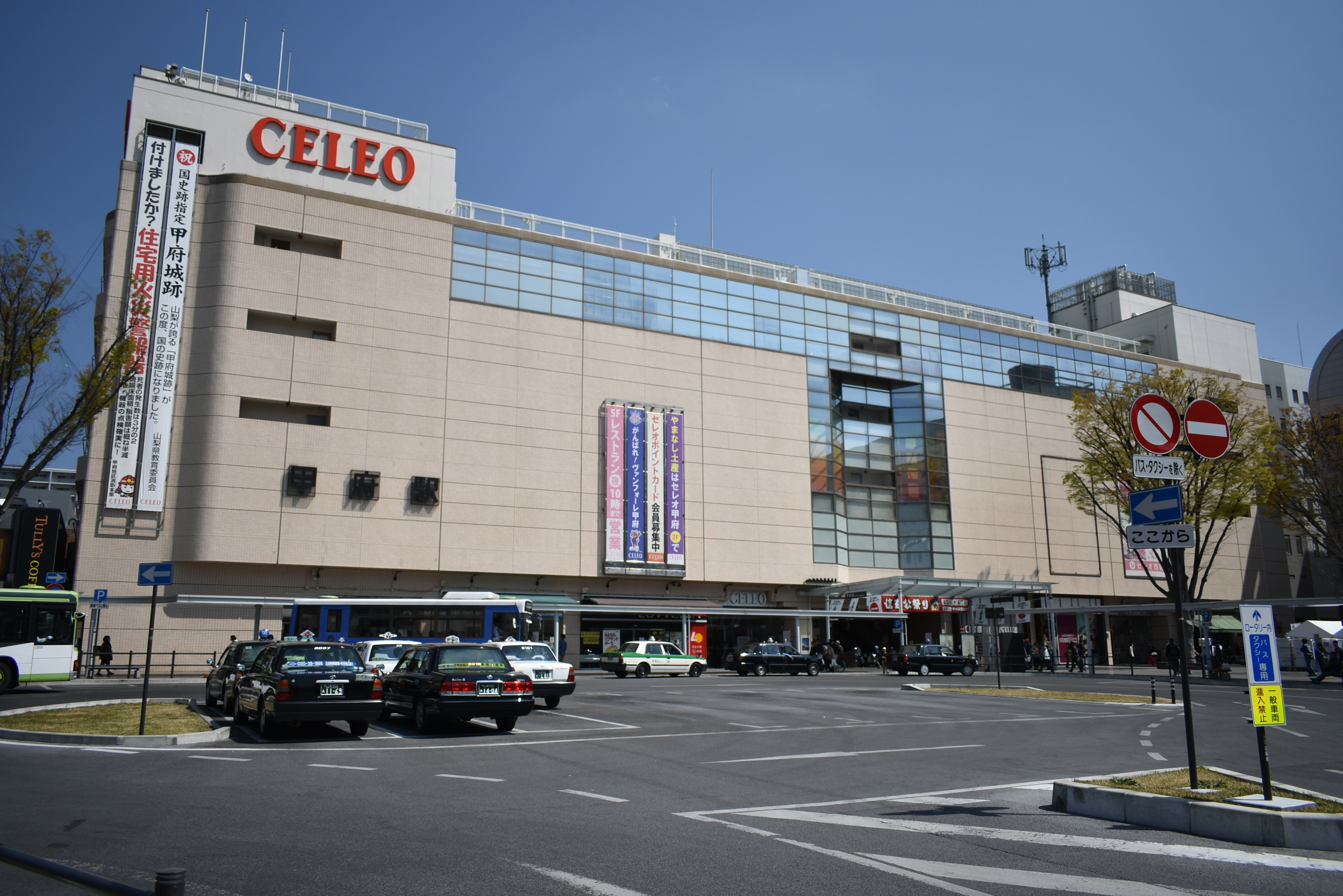
Kōfu Station

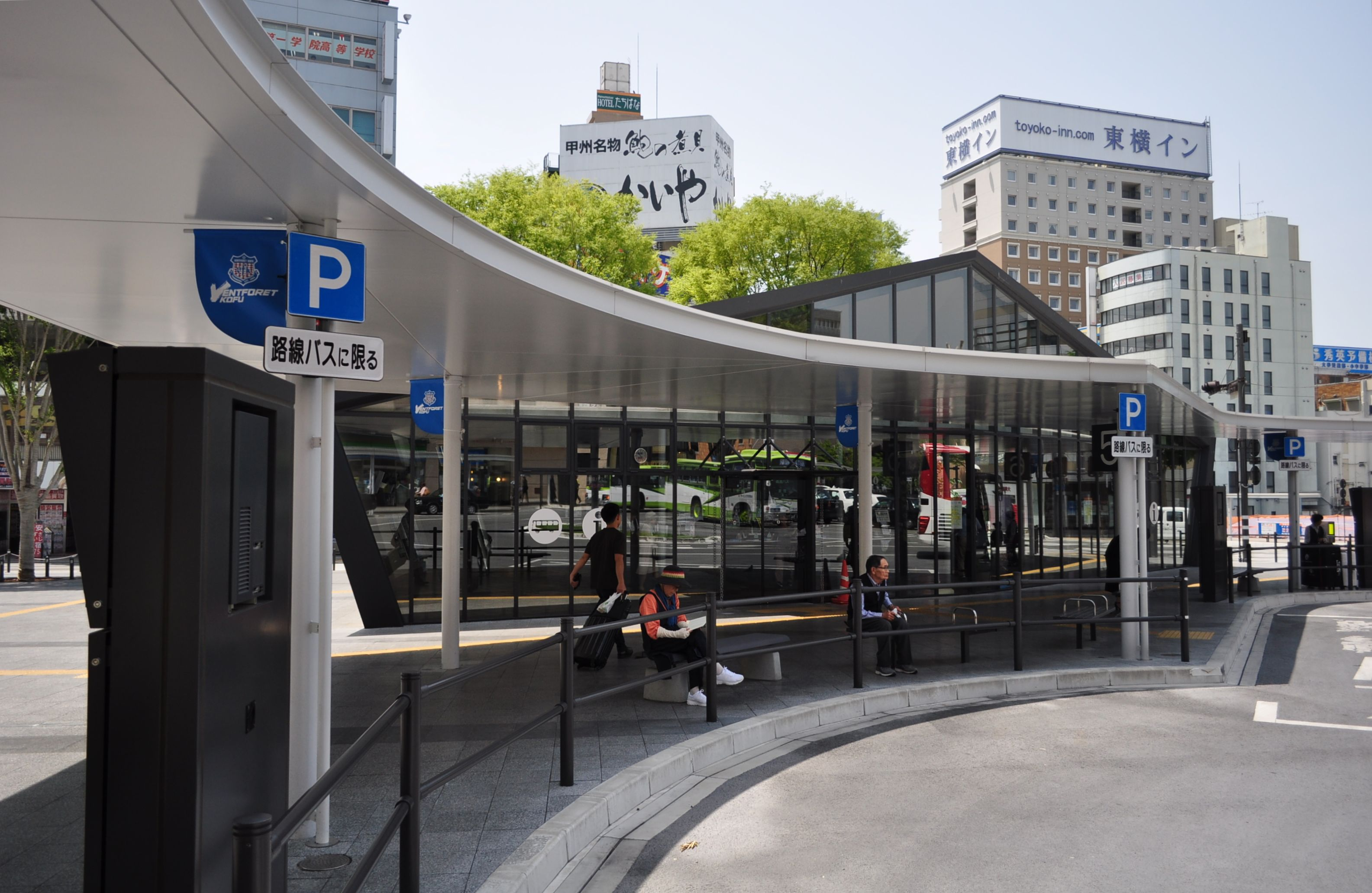
Kōfu Station Bus Terminu

=== Airways ===
==== Airports ====
The nearest airport is Matsumoto Airport & Shizuoka Airport or Haneda Airport & Narita International Airport.

=== Railways ===
==== Conventional Lines ====
East Japan Railway Company (JR East)

- Chūō Main Line: Kōfu -

Central Japan Railway Company (JR Tōkai)

- Minobu Line: - Kokubo - Kai-Sumiyoshi - Minami-Kōfu - Zenkōji - Kanente - Kōfu

=== Buses ===
==== Bus Terminus ====
- Kōfu Station Bus Terminu

=== Roads ===
==== Expressway ====
- Chūō Expressway

==== Japan National Route ====
- National Route 20
- National Route 52
- National Route 140
- National Route 137
- National Route 358
- National Route 411

== Local attractions ==
=== Historical Sites ===
- Kai Zenkō-ji
- Kōfu Castle
- Ōmaruyama Kofun
- Takeda Shrine
- Tsutsujigasaki Castle
- Yōgaiyama Castle

=== Other sites ===
- Yamanashi Prefectural Art Museum
- Yamanashi Science Museum
- Yumura Onsen

== Culture ==
=== Festivals ===
==== Shingen-ko Festival ====
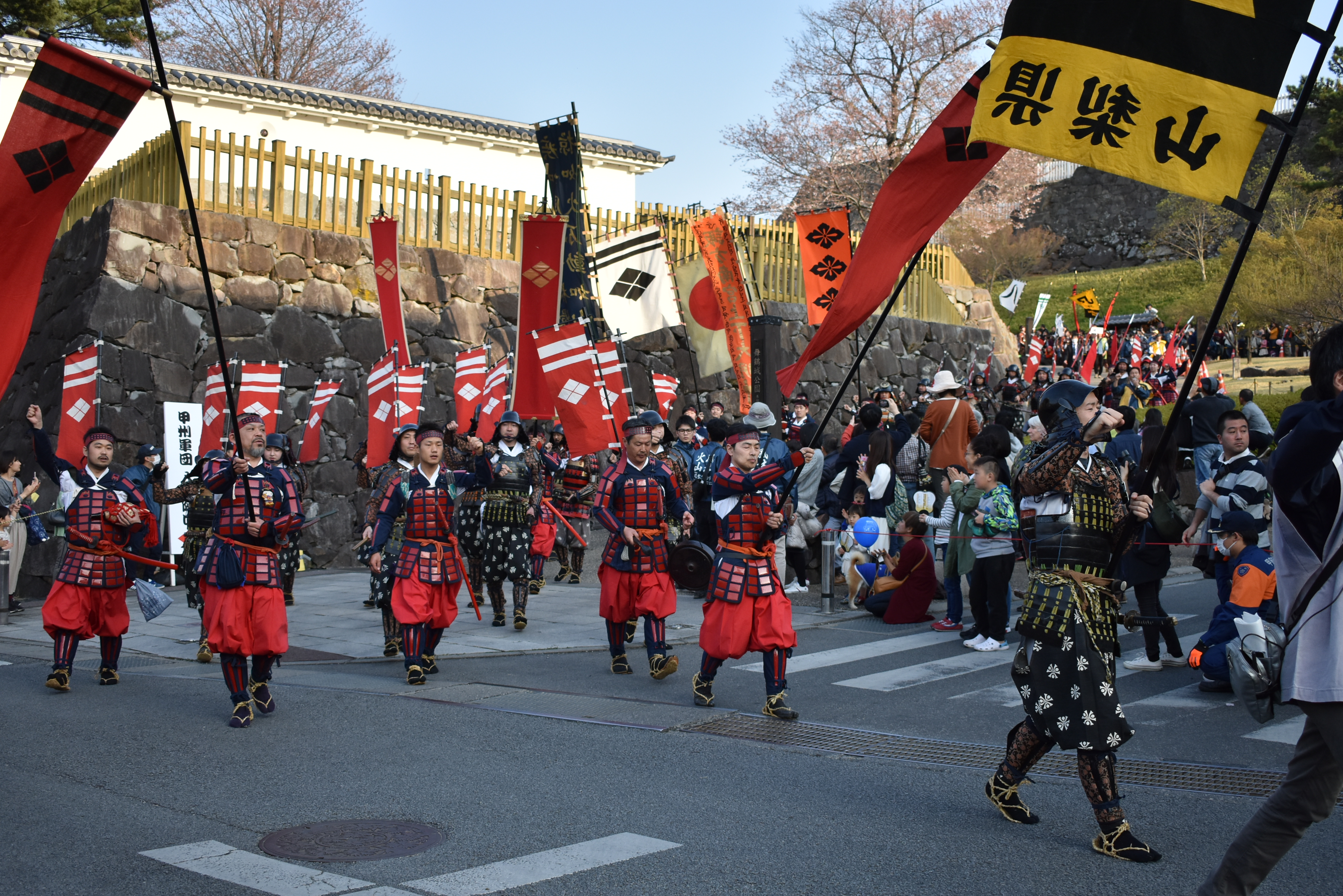
Shingen-ko Festival — the army corps in front of Kōfu Castle (2019)

The biggest festival in Kōfu is the Shingen-ko Festival (信玄公祭り, Shingen-ko Matsuri). It is held annually on the first or second weekend of April and celebrates the legacy of Takeda Shingen. The festival is three days long. Usually a famous Japanese celebrity plays the part of Takeda Shingen. There are several parades going to and from the Takeda Shrine and Kōfu Castle. This is the largest public history play in Japan. In 2012 the event was included in the Guinness World Records as the "largest gathering of samurai" in the world with 1061 participants.

=== Sports ===
Club	Sport	League	Venue	Established
Yamanashi Queenbees	Basketball	W.League	Kose sports park gymnasium, Kōfu General Civic Center	1968
Ventforet Kofu	Soccer	J.League (J2)	JIT Recycle Ink Stadium	1990

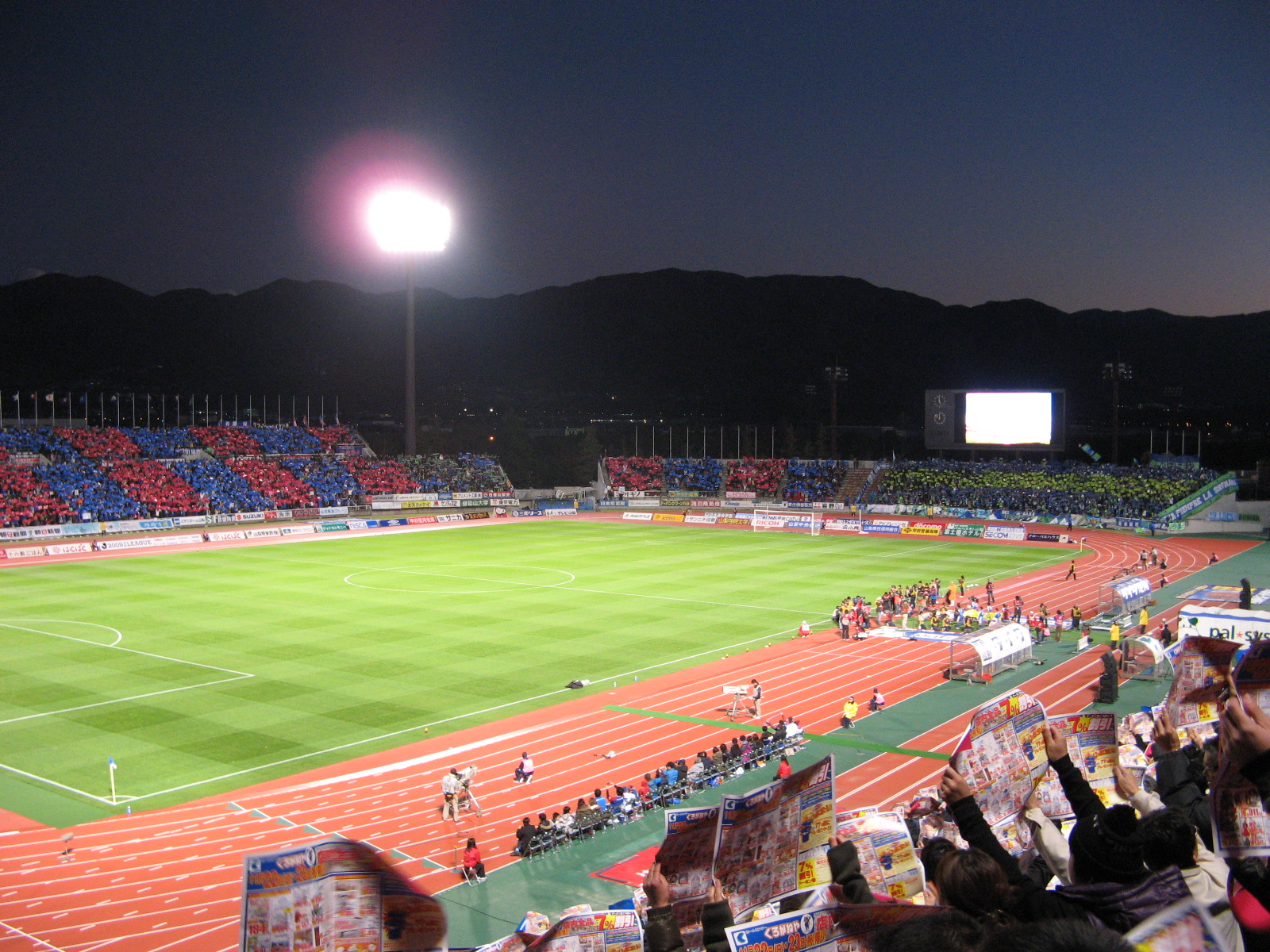
JIT Recycle Ink Stadium

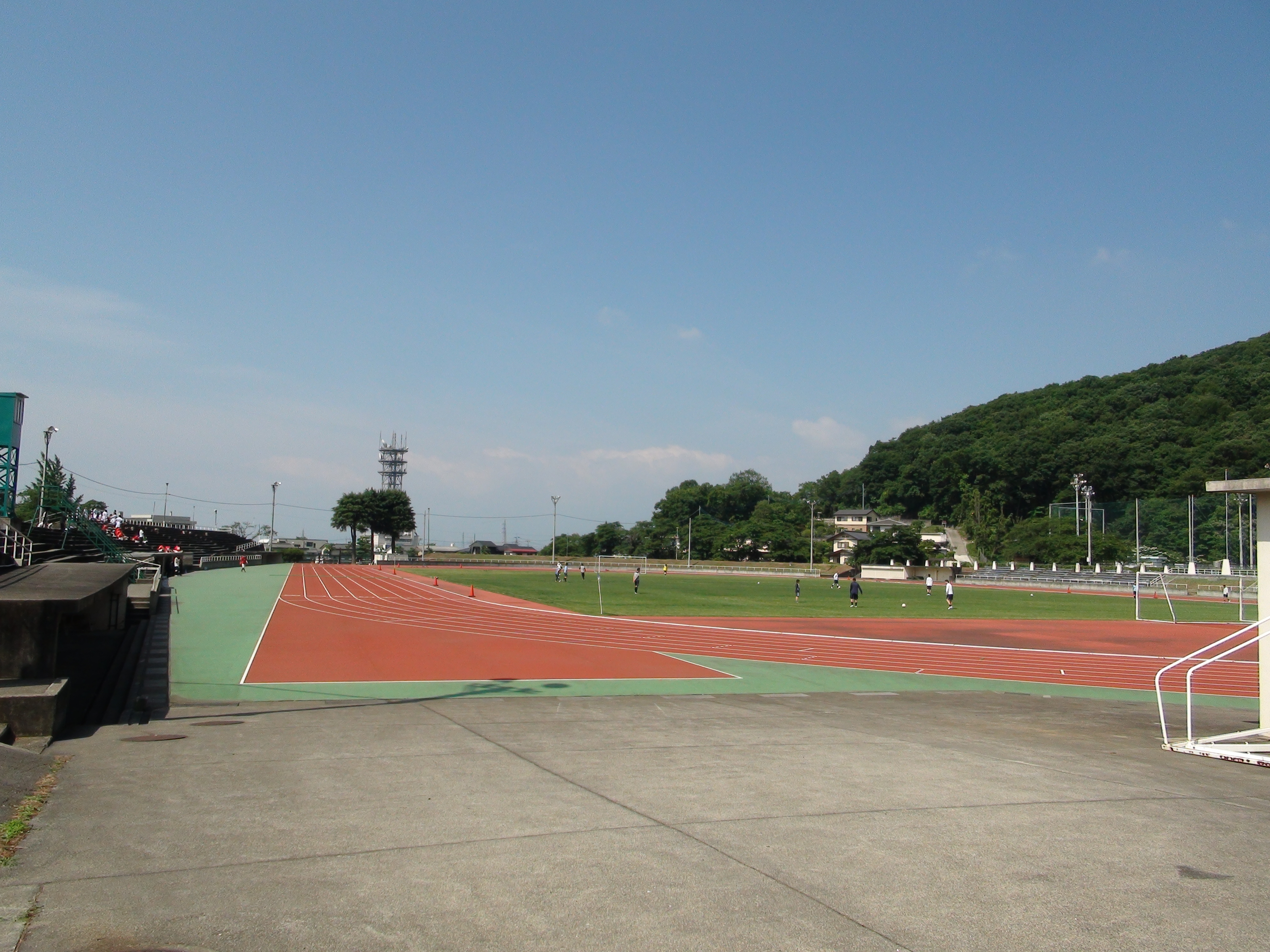
Kofu Midorigaoka Sports Park Stadium

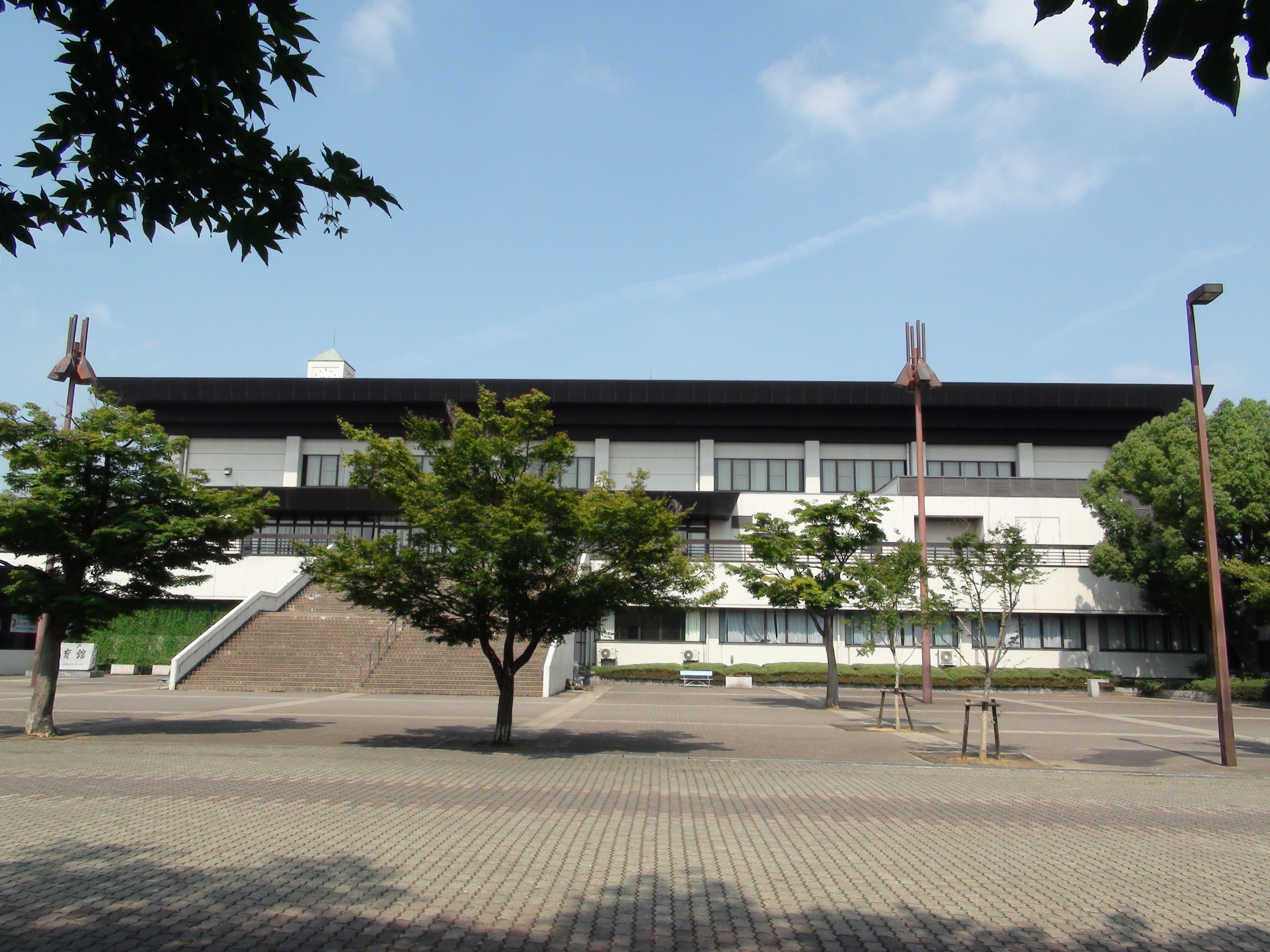
Arena of Kose sports park gymnasium

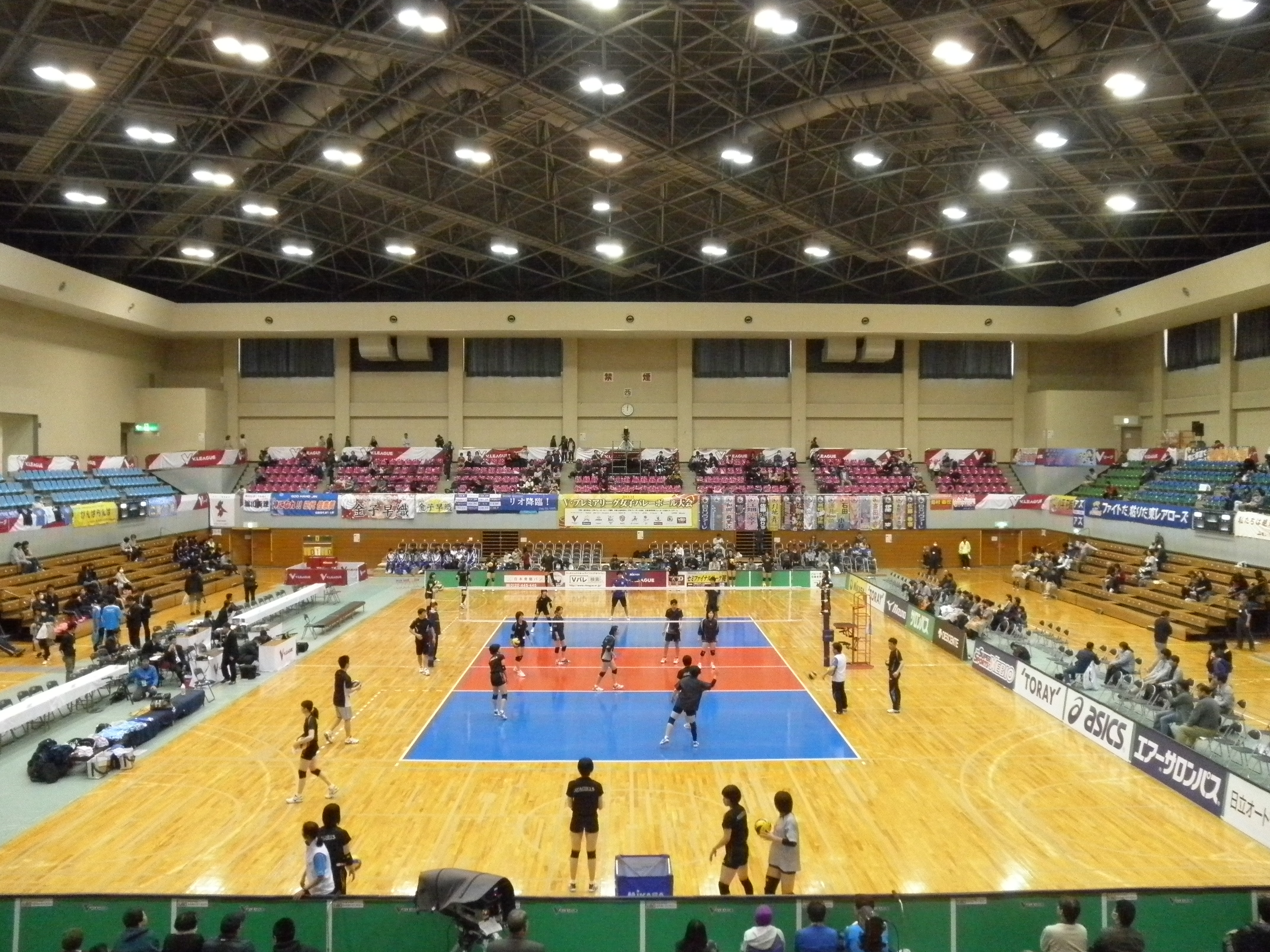
Arena of Kose sports park gymnasium

== Notable people from Kofu ==
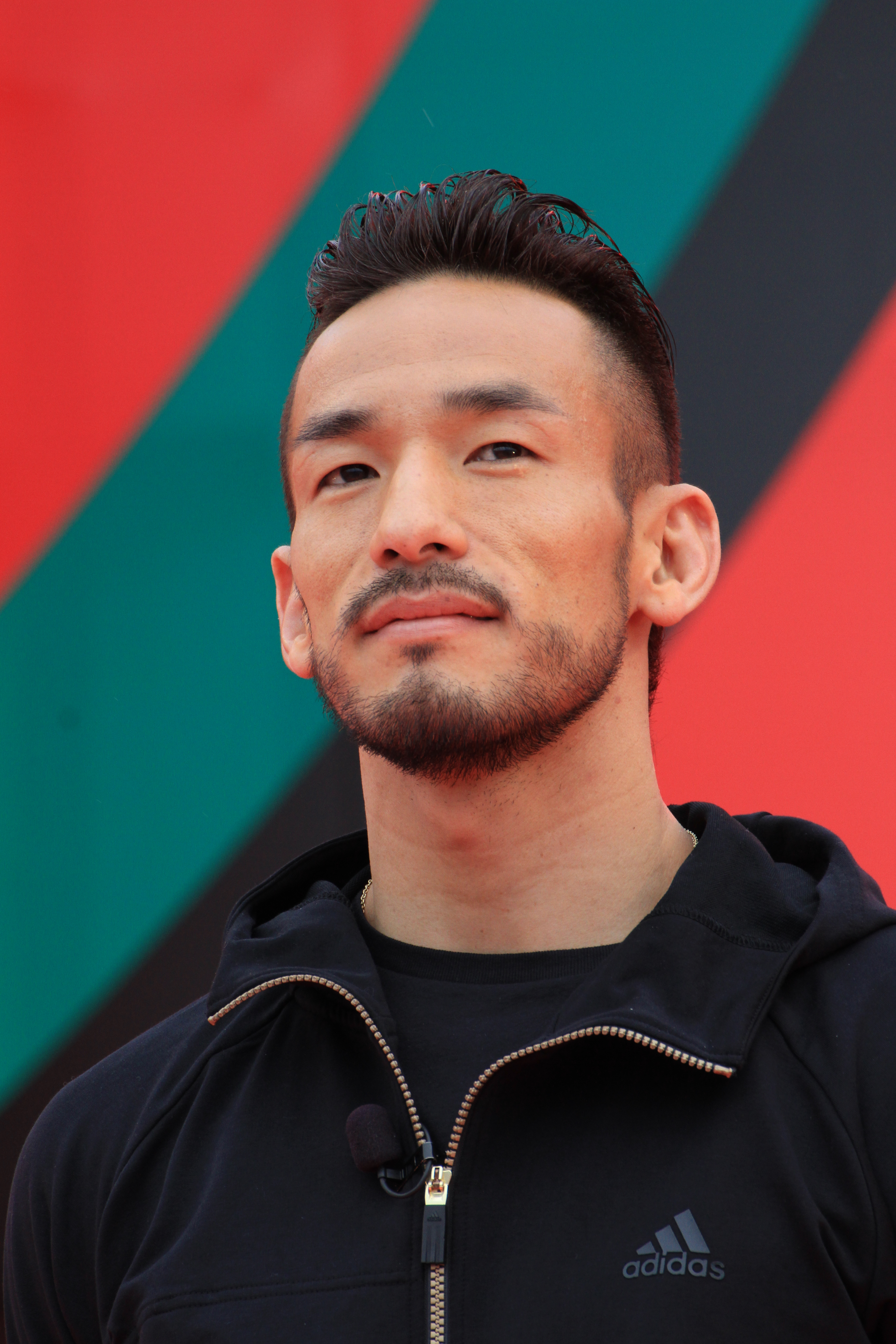
Hidetoshi Nakata

- Saiki Atsumi – lead singer of the rock band Band-Maid
- Naoto Fukasawa – industrial designer
- Banjō Ginga – voice actor
- Ryūden Gōshi - sumo wrestler
- Hideo Hagiwara – woodblock print artist
- Tsuneo Horiuchi – former manager of Yomiuri Giants baseball team
- Takao Kajimoto – former professional baseball player and sports announcer
- Junichi Kanemaru - voice actor
- Yoshinobu Kanemaru – professional wrestler
- Hiroki Nakamura – founder and designer of cult fashion brand Visvim
- Hidetoshi Nakata - football player who last played with the Bolton Wanderers in the Premier League, but has since retired following the 2006 World Cup.
- Naoko Takeuchi – manga artist, creator of Sailor Moon and other comics.
- Mariko Tsutsui - actress with notable lead roles in Kōji Fukada's Harmonium and A Girl Missing
- Fujizakura Yoshimori – former sumo wrestler

== List of mayors of Kofu ==
This is a list of Kofu majors starting from 1889.

- Itsupei Wakao (若尾逸平) 29 August 1889 to 3 June 1890
- Tadao Takagi (高木忠雄) 11 July 1890 to 28 September 1897
- Hikotaro Ishihara (石原彦太郎) 6 November 1897 to 18 June 1898
- Kunsaku Kobayashi (小林董作) 19 September 1898 to 18 June 1906
- Tamizo Wakao (若尾民造) 24 July 1906 to 5 March 1907
- Heishiro Kato (加藤平四郎) 20 April 1907 to 17 August 1915
- Tadayoshi Natori (名取忠愛) 15 January 1916 to 25 June 1919
- 23 September 1922 to 14 March 1923
- Nobutsugu Hori (堀信次) 23 October 1919 to 19 June 1922
- Atsuo Ishii (石井淳雄) 31 July 1923 to 30 July 1927
- Jihei Narishima (成島治平) 8 October 1927 to 8 August 1931
- Eiji Shinkai (新海栄治) 24 August 1931 to 26 August 1935
- 12 September 1939 to 11 September 1943
- Itsuzo Saiki (斎木逸造) 27 August 1935 to 11 September 1939
- Jiro Noguchi (野口二郎) 12 September 1943 to 27 February 1946
- Moemon Imai (今井茂右衛門) 18 March 1946 to 3 September 1947
- Shigehisa Kawamura (川村茂久) 10 October 1947 to 25 December 1948
- Tatsuo Yamamoto (山本達雄) 25 February 1949 to 22 February 1953
- Keijiro Takano (鷹野啓次郎) 25 February 1953 to 11 November 1968
- Kiyoshi Akiyama (秋山清) 29 November 1968 to 24 February 1971
- Chikayoshi Kawaguchi (河口親賀) 25 April 1971 to 26 April 1983
- Chuzo Hara (原忠三) 27 April 1983 to 26 April 1991
- Hidehiko Yamamoto (山本栄彦) 27 April 1991 to 19 December 2002
- Masanobu Miyajima (宮島雅展) 3 April 2003 to 1 February 2015
- Yuichi Higuchi (樋口雄一) 2 February 2015 to Incumbent
