= Zenkō-ji (disambiguation) =

Zenkō-ji (善光寺) is the name of numerous Buddhist temples in Japan. Below is an incomplete list:

- Kai Zenkō-ji (甲斐善光寺) in Kōfu, Yamanashi Prefecture
- Zenkō-ji in Nagano, Nagano Prefecture
- Motozenkō-ji (元善光寺) in Iida, Nagano Prefecture
- Zenkō-ji in Gifu, Gifu Prefecture
- Zenkō-ji Tōkaibetsuin (善光寺東海別院) in Sobue, Aichi Prefecture
- Koyama Zenkō-ji (小山善光寺) in Fujiidera, Osaka Prefecture
- Zenkō-ji in Yao, Osaka Prefecture
- Buzen Zenkō-ji (豊前善光寺) in Usa, Ōita Prefecture
- Zenkō-ji (Tokyo), Japan
