= Nagano Prefectural Art Museum =

Art museum in Nagano, Japan

Coordinates: 36.6616°N 138.1907°E

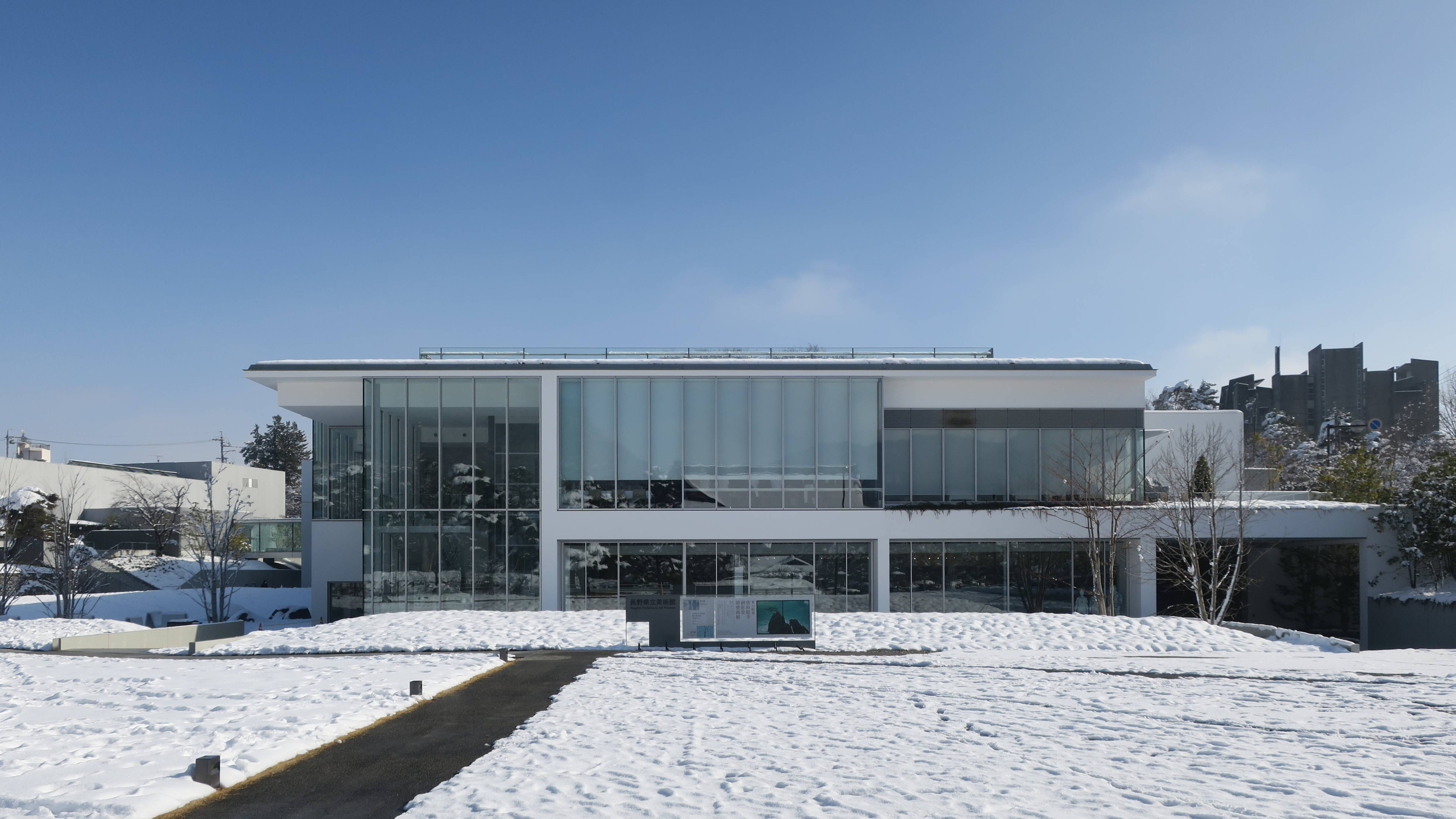
Nagano Prefectural Art Museum

Nagano Prefectural Art Museum (長野県立美術館, Nagano Kenritsu Bijutsukan) is a museum in Nagano, Nagano Prefecture, Japan. It is one of Japan's many museums which are supported by a prefecture.

== History ==
The museum first opened as the Shinano Art Museum Foundation, and is located next to the Zenkō-ji Buddhist Temple. Due to the deterioration of the building, it was reopened on April 10, 2021, as the Nagano Prefectural Art Museum.
