= Hitachi Kokubun-ji =

Buddhist temple in Ibaraki Prefecture, Japan

- 陸奥国分寺
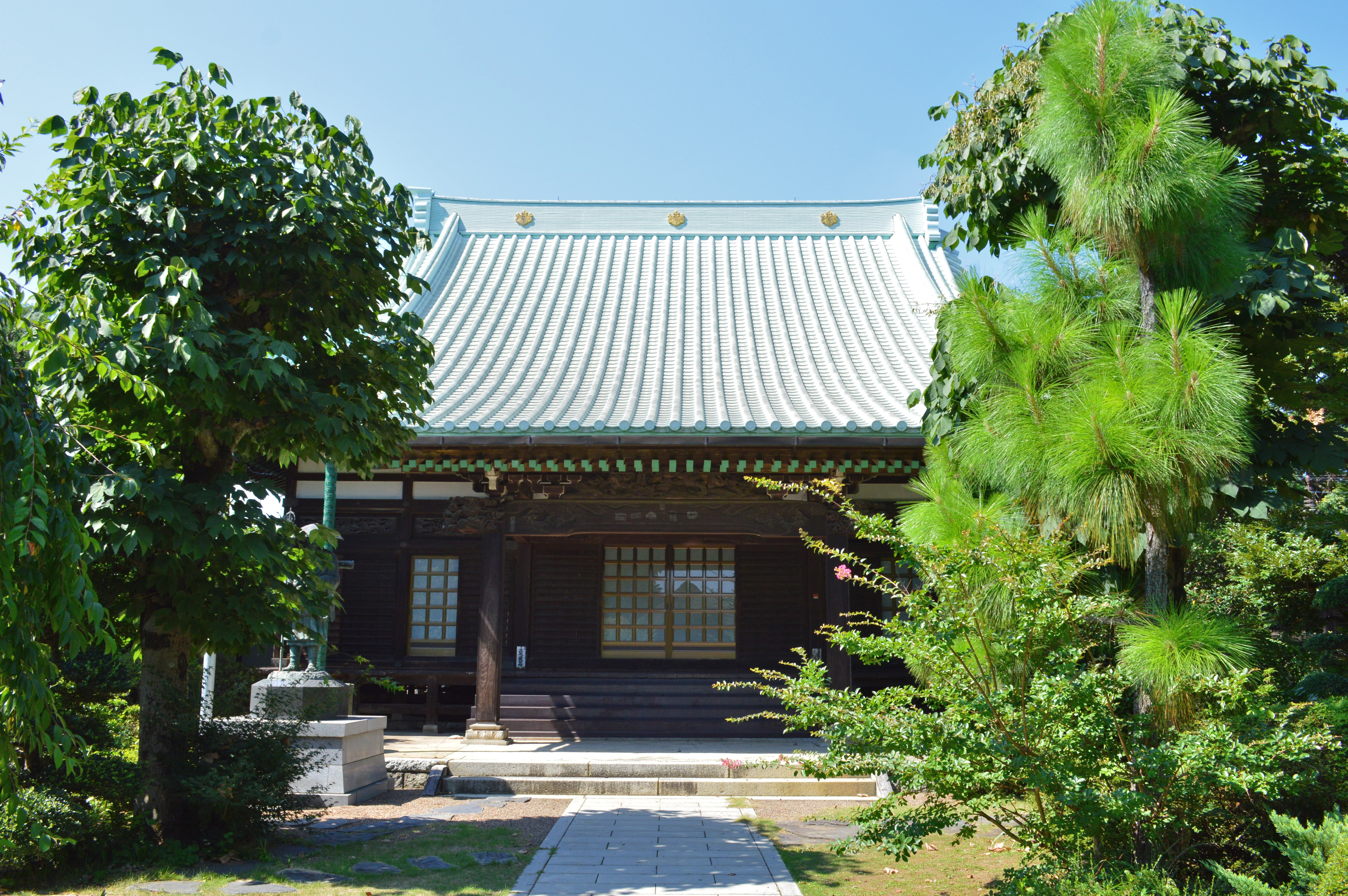
- Hitachi Kokubun-ji Hondo

- Hitachi Kokubun-ji Hitachi Kokubun-ji (Japan)

Religion
- Affiliation: Buddhist
- Deity: Yakushi Nyōrai
- Rite: Shingon-shū Chizan-ha
- Status: active

Location
- Location: 5-1-5 Fuchū, Ishioka-shi, Ibaraki-ken
- Country: Japan
- Interactive map of Hitachi Kokubun-ji
- Coordinates: 36°11′46.34″N 140°16′24.09″E

Architecture
- Founder: Emperor Shōmu
- Completed: c. 752

Website
- Official website (in Japanese)
- Special National Historic Site of Japan

Hitachi Kokubun-ji (常陸国分寺) is a Buddhist temple located in the Fuchū neighborhood of the city of Ishioka, Ibaraki Prefecture, Japan. It belongs to the Shingon-shū Chizan-ha sect, and its honzon is an image of Yakushi Nyōrai. It is the modern successor of the provincial temple ("kokubunji") of former Hitachi Province. The ruins of the Nara period temple and the nearby nunnery have been collectively protected as a National Historic Site since 1922. In 1952, the designation was upgraded to that of a Special National Historic Site.

== Hitachi Kokubun-ji ==
The Shoku Nihongi records that in 741, as the country recovered from a major smallpox epidemic, Emperor Shōmu ordered that a monastery and nunnery be established in every province. These temples had the dual purpose of promoting Buddhism as the national religion of Japan and standardising control of the imperial rule to the provinces.

The actual date the Hitachi Kokubun-ji was founded is unknown. Per the "Hitachi-Fuchū Kagami", the temple was founded in 743 and consecrated in 752. The original design of the temple was a walled square compound measuring 270 meters east-to-west by 240 meters north-to-south. The compound contained a large South Gate, Middle Gate, Kondō, Lecture Hall, Cloisters, Rectory and a seven-story Pagoda, sutra library, Bellfry, Kuri, and monk's dormitory. However, as the buildings of the modern temple partially overlap the foundations of the ancient temple, the exact size and placement of many of the structures of the ancient temple are uncertain. The site was surveyed in 1977 and excavated in 1982 at which time it was estimated that the original Kondō was four times larger than the present temple's Hondō.The patterns on some of the roof tiles are identical to the eaves tiles found at the Heijō-kyō palace site in Nara, suggesting that experts from the central government were providing technical guidance when the temple was constructed.

Per the Engishiki records of 927 AD, the temple was one of the richest in the kokubunji system in terms of rice revenue. The temple was destroyed once by a fire, some 80 years after it was founded, and again in 939 during the rebellion of Taira no Masakado. It was rebuilt both times, but was against largely destroyed by fire during the battles of the Satake clan in the Sengoku period, the last of which was in 1585. The temple went into rapid decline afterwards, and by the Keichō era (1596–1615) it did not even have a resident priest, but was reduced in status to that of a subsidiary chapel of a neighboring temple called the Senjū-in. In 1919, Senjū-in and Kokubun-ji merged to form the current Kokubun-ji, and Senjū-in was abandoned. The temple's Sanmon is the only surviving structure of Senjū-in, and is designated a Tangible Cultural Property of Ishioka city.

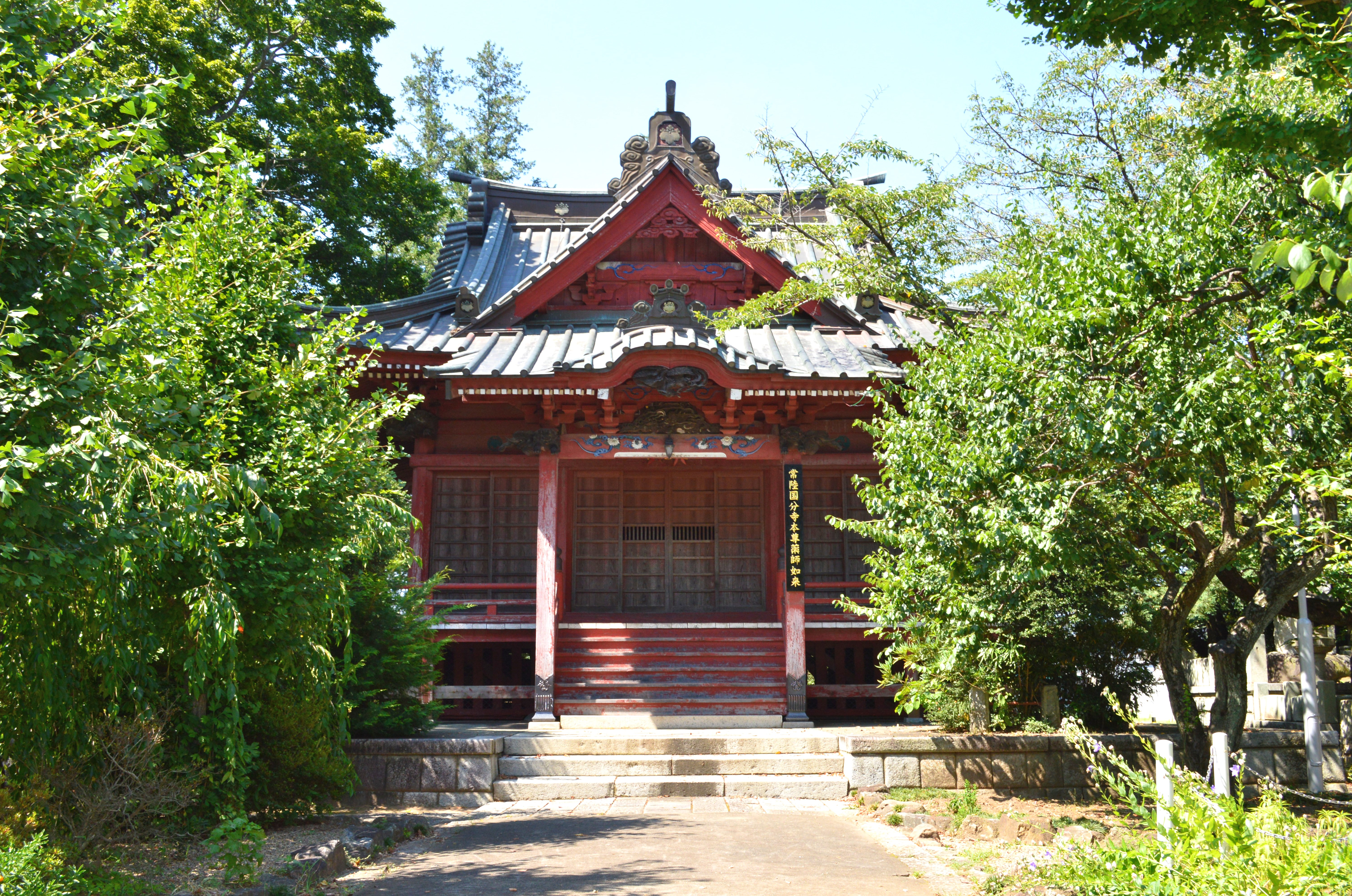
Yakushi-dō

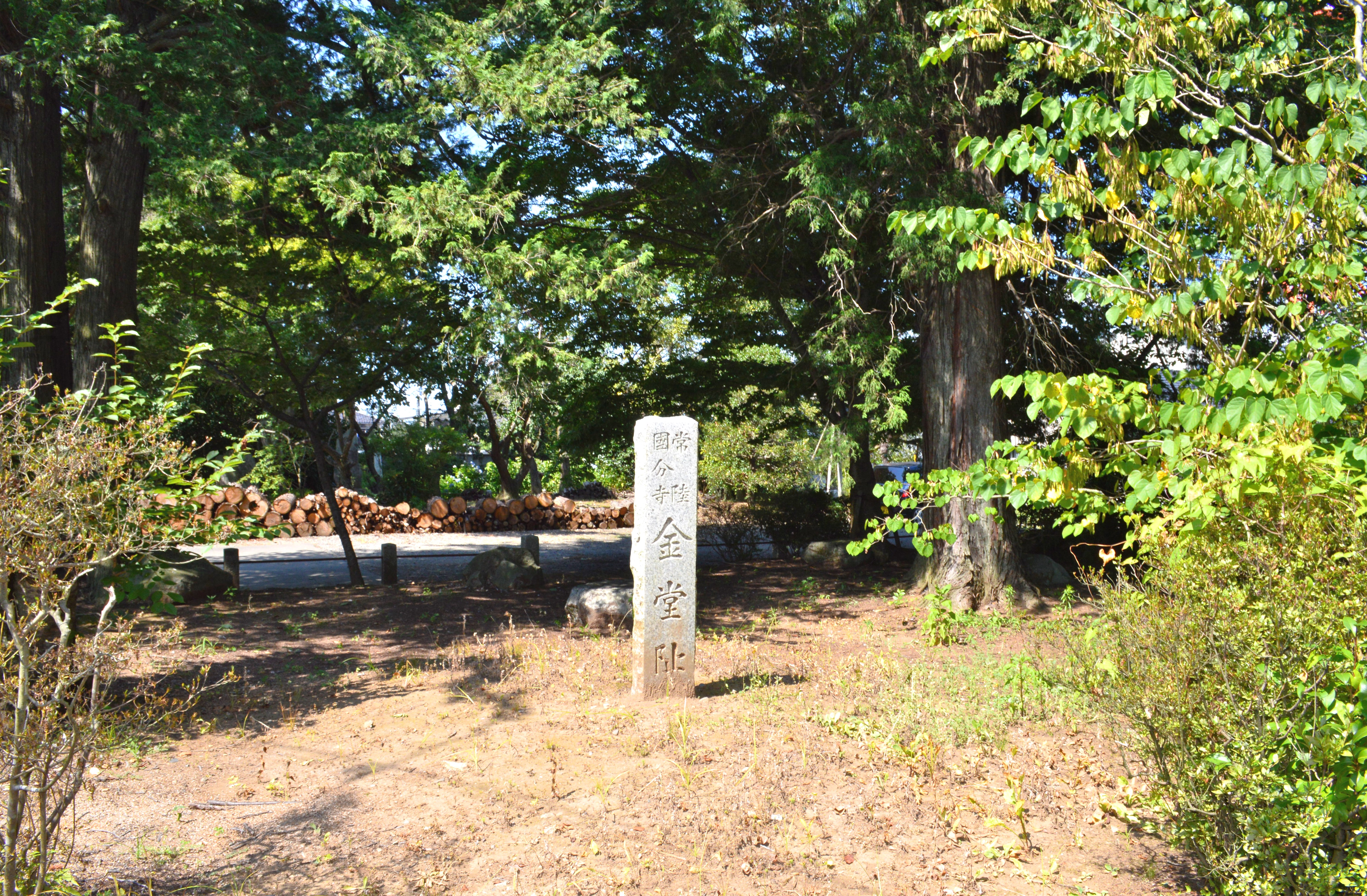
Site of the original Kondō

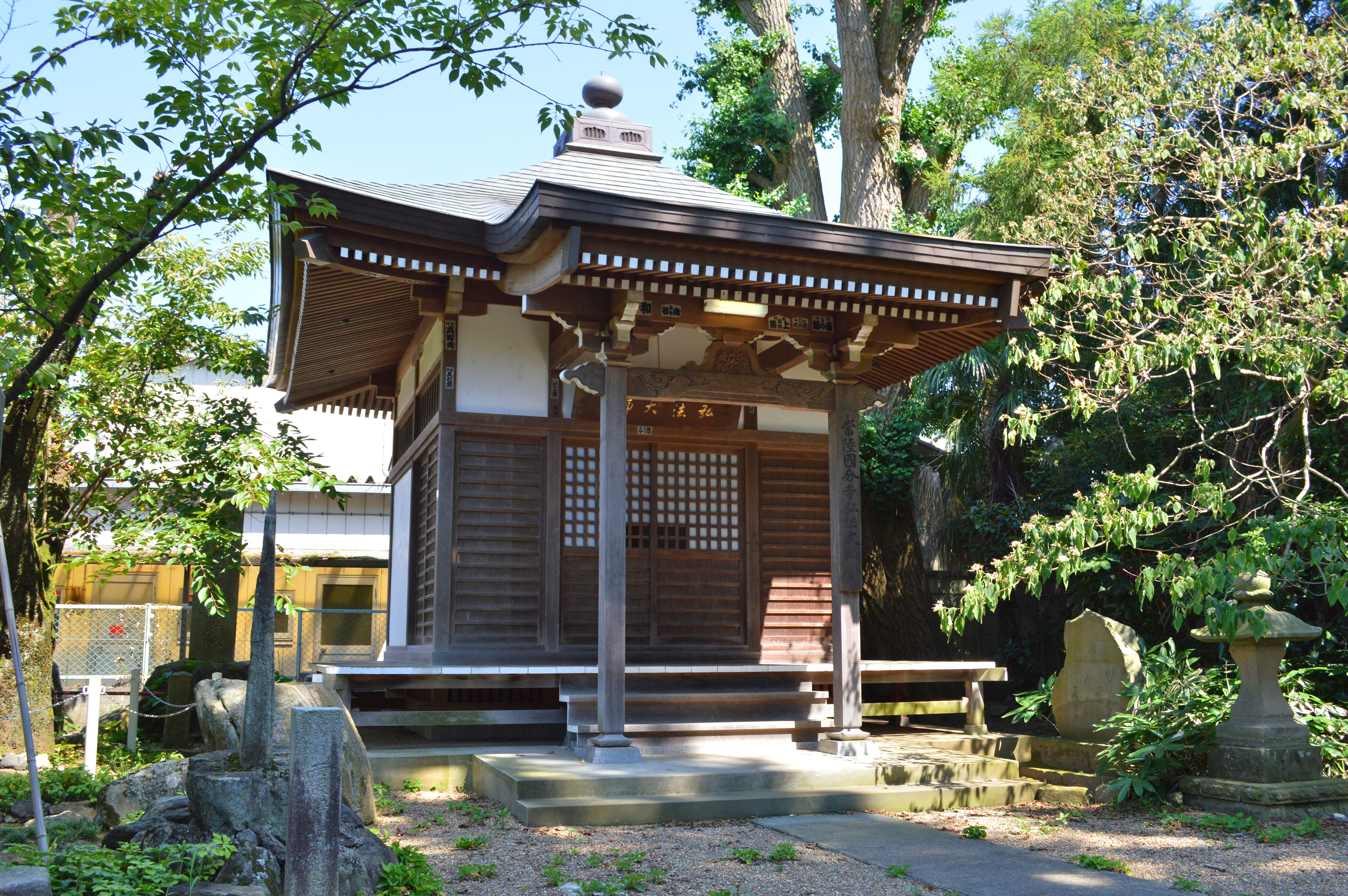
Kōbō Daishi-dō

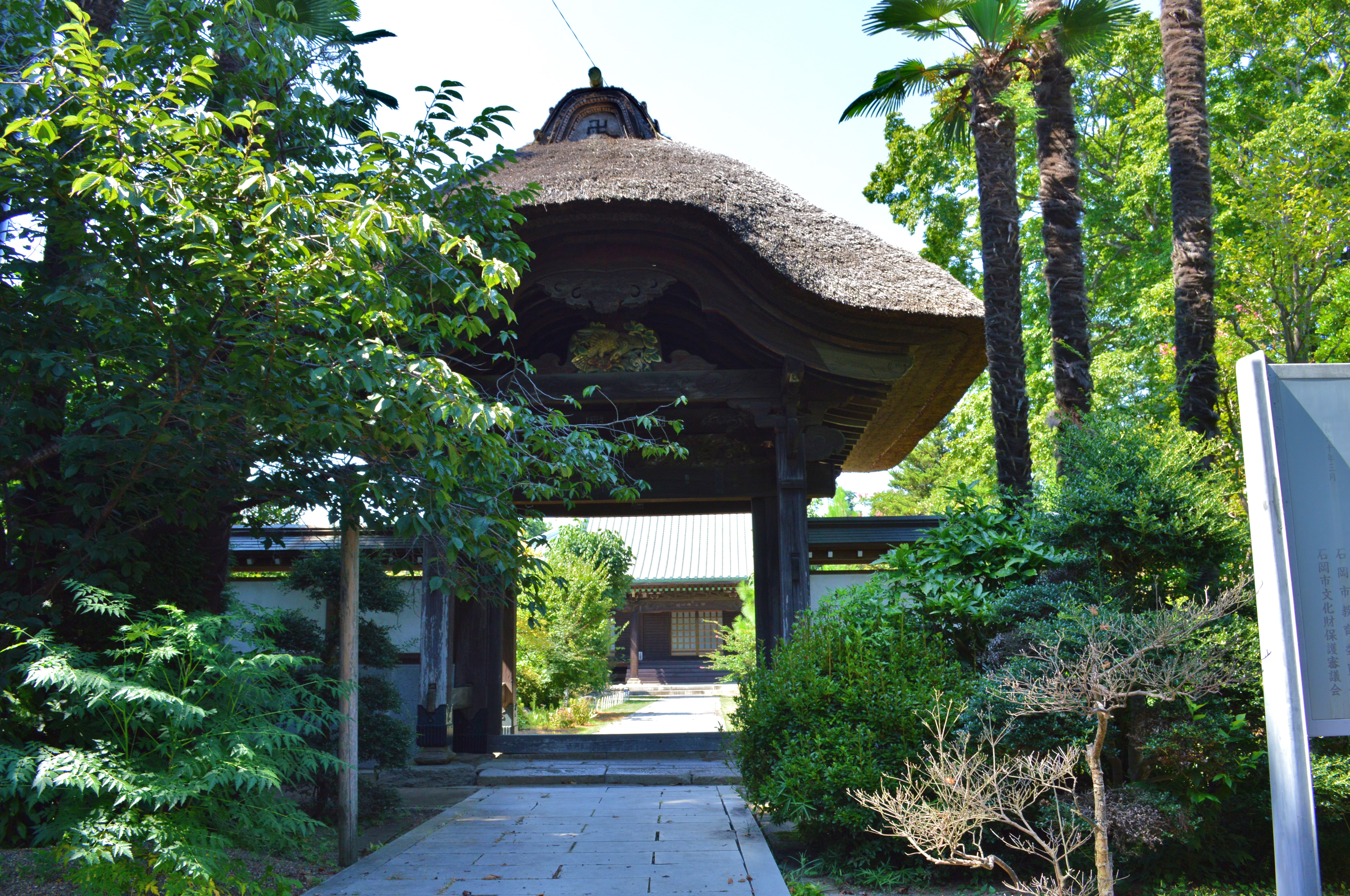
former Senjū-in Sanmon

== Hitachi Kokubun-niji ==
The provincial nunnery, the Hitachi Kokubun-niji (常陸国分尼寺) associated with the Hitachi Kokubun-ji was located about 600 meters to the northwest. The nunnery occupied a 164 meter square walled compound, within which the buildings were arranged in the manner of Tōdai-ji in Nara with a South Gate, Middle Gate, Kondō, and Lecture Hall arranged in a straight line. Cloisters from the left and right of the Middle Gate surrounded the Kondō and connected it to the Lecture Hall. Per the Shinpen Hitachi-no-kuni-shi, the nunnery was burned down during a battle involving the Satake clan in 1590.

Per an excavation conducted in1969, traces of moats that demarcate the temple with a width of about three meters were discovered in the west, south, and north sides.

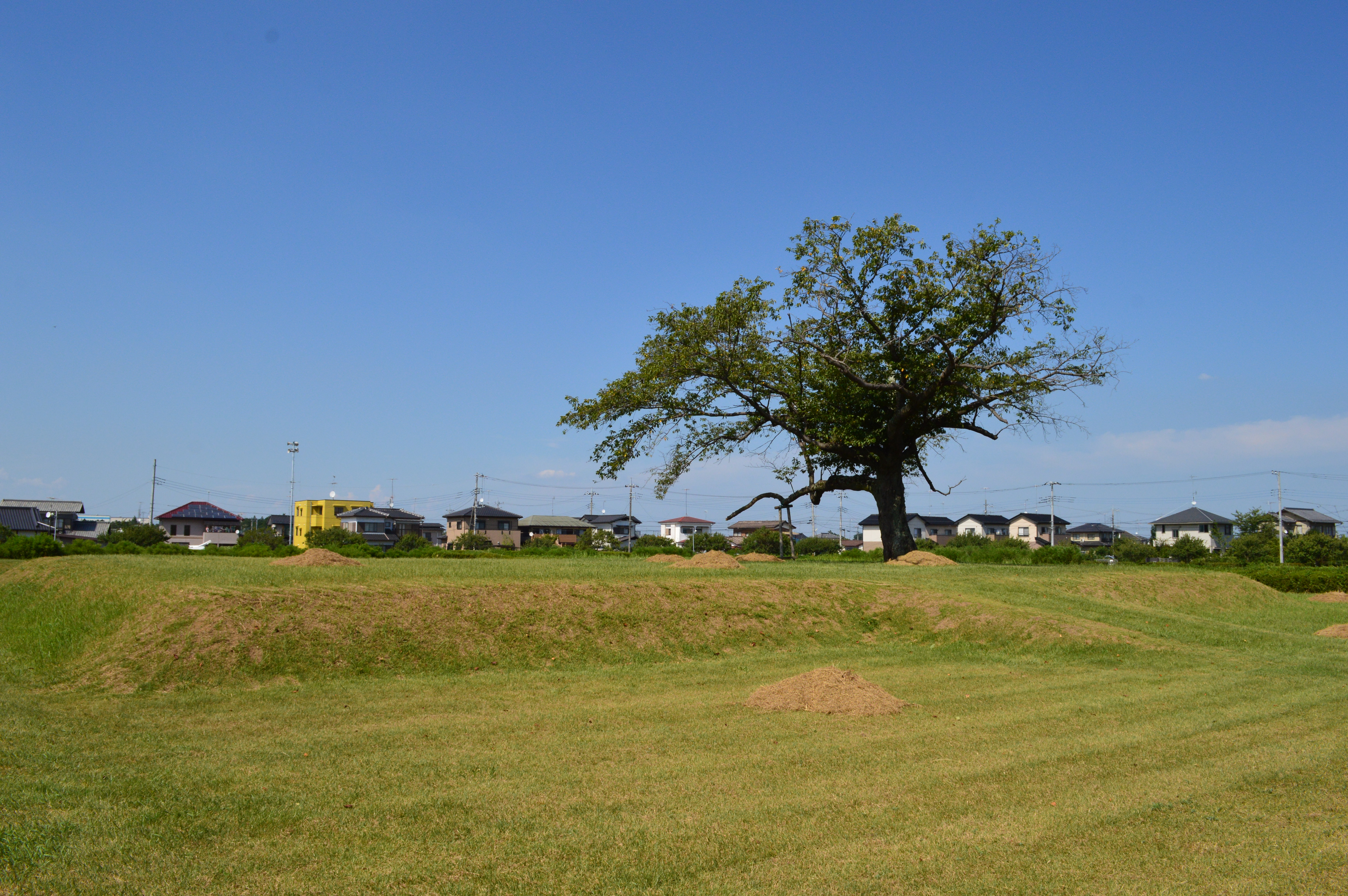
Site of the Kondō

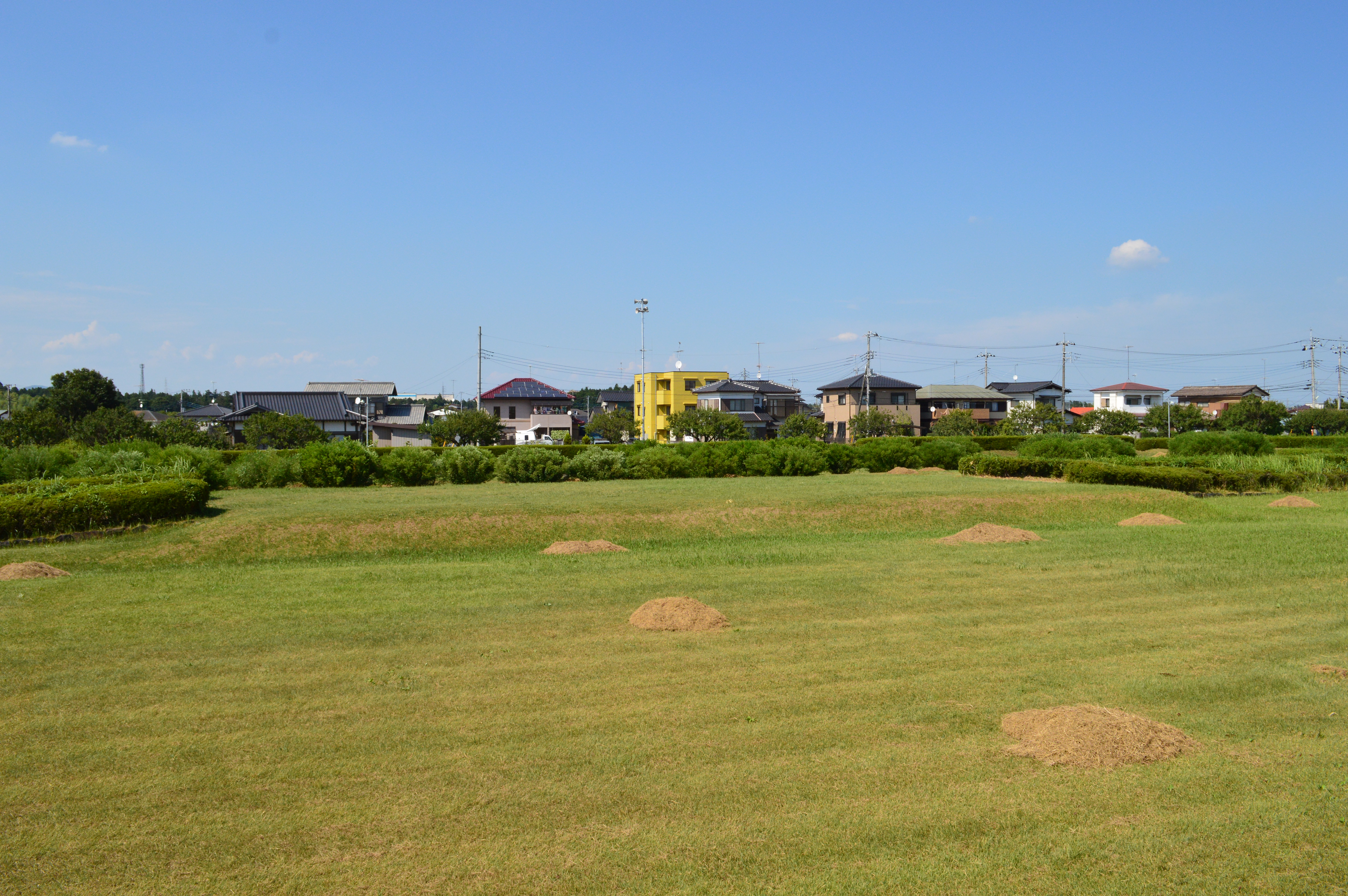
Site of the Lecture Hall

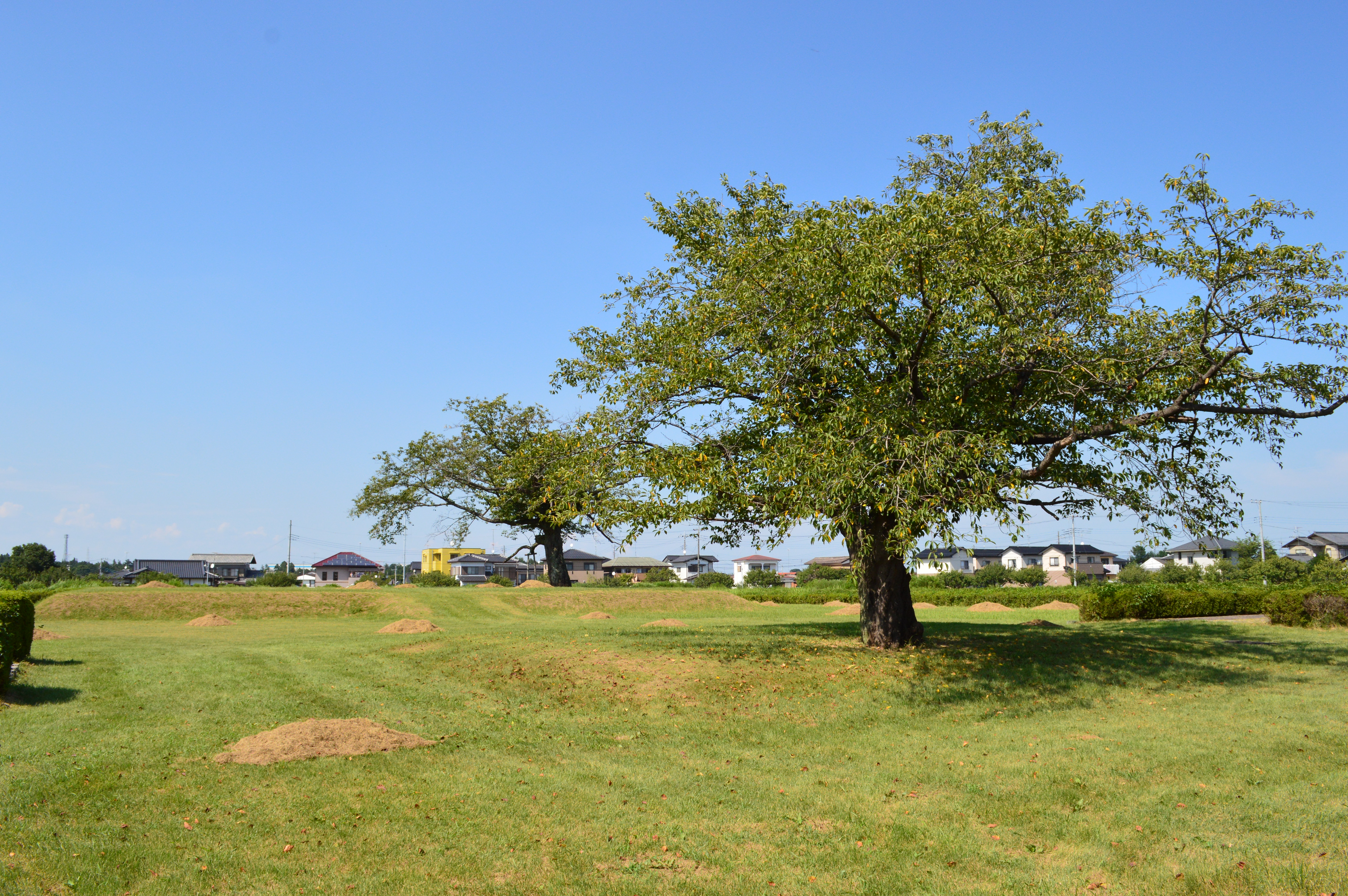
Site of the Middle Gate

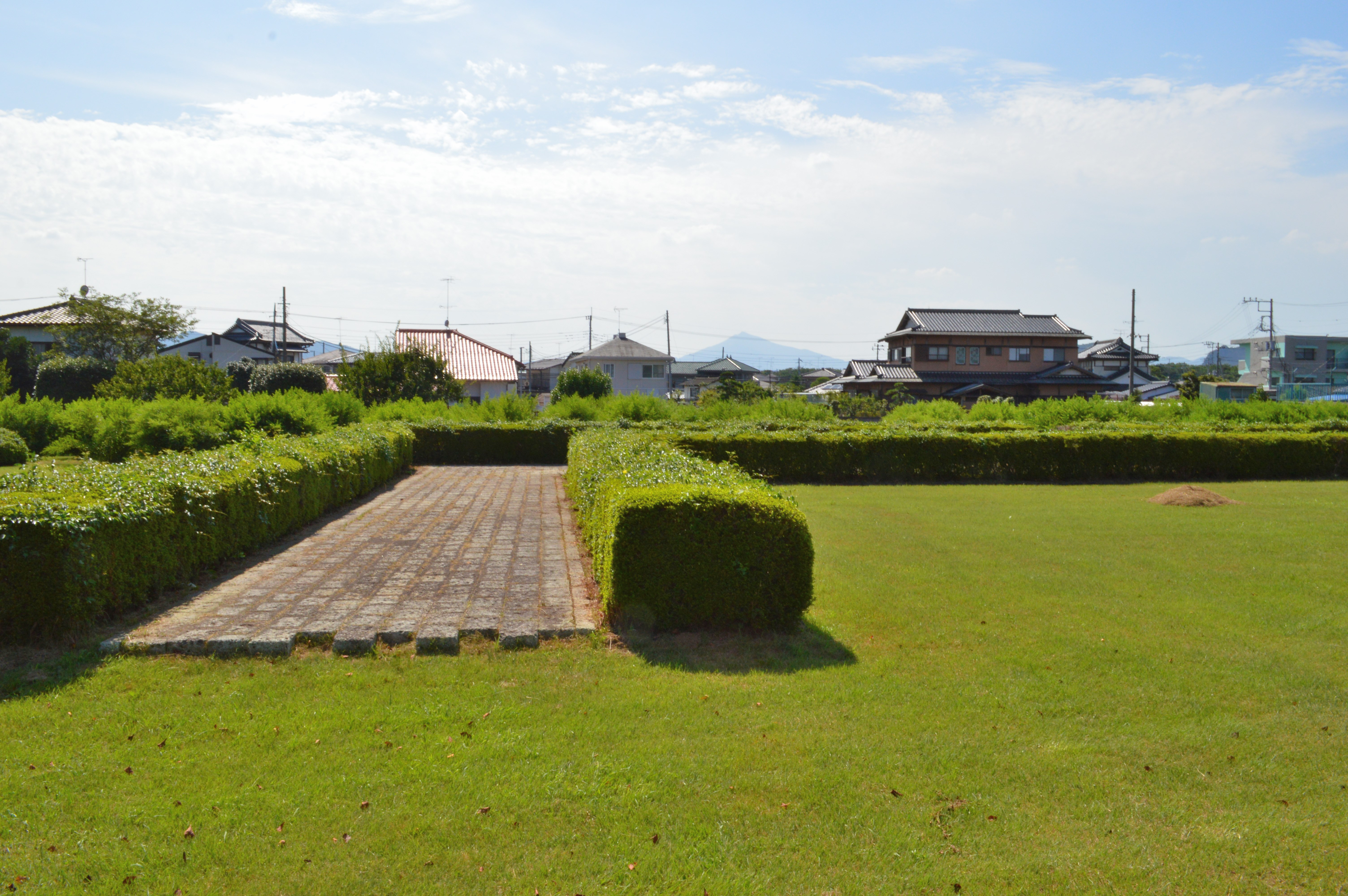
Site of the Cloisters

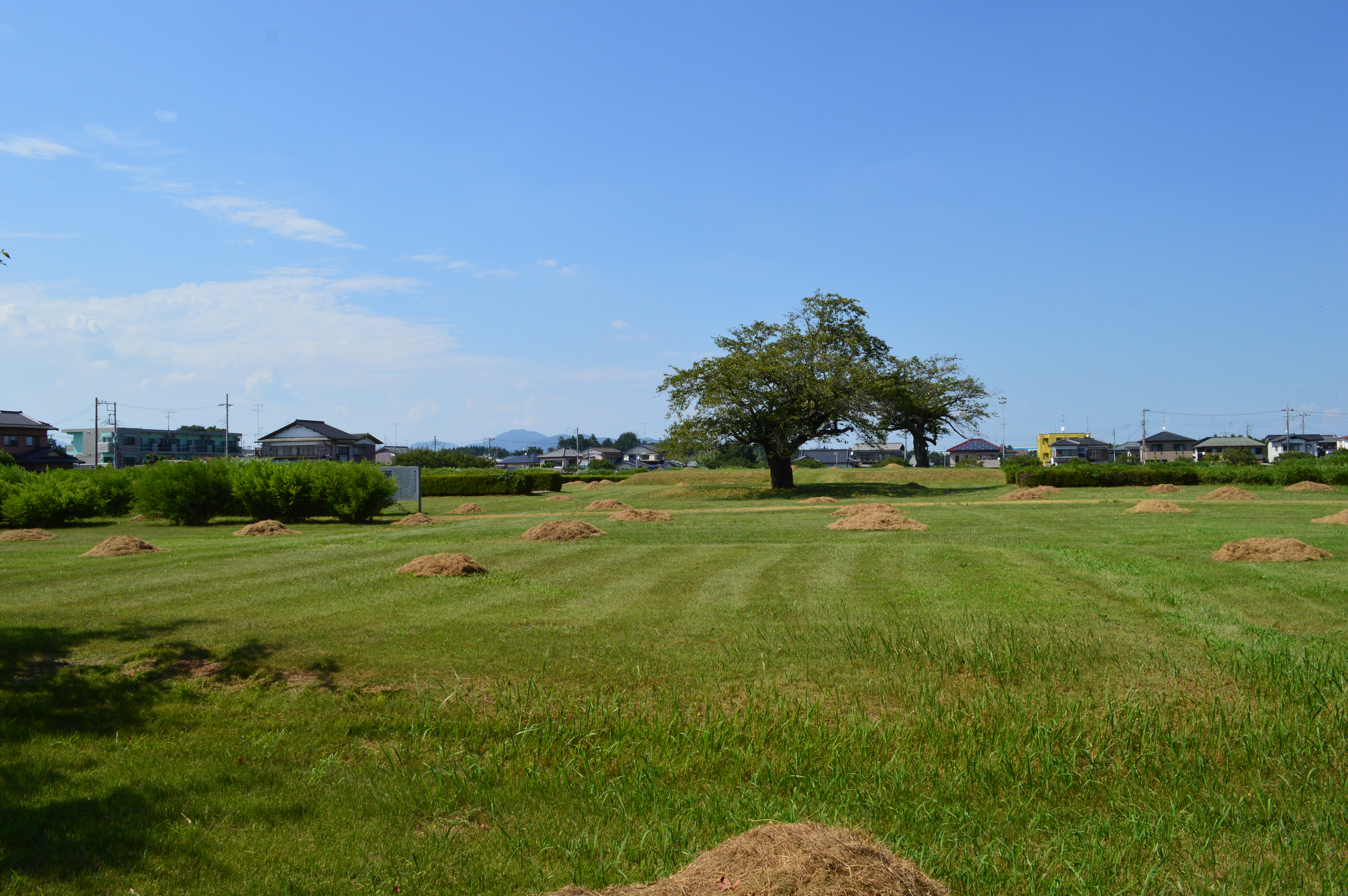
Site of the South Gate

== See also ==
- Provincial temple
- List of Historic Sites of Japan (Ibaraki)
- Kawaratsuka Kiln, tile kiln which made the roof tiles for the Hitachi Kokubun-ji and Hitachi Kokubun-niji
