= Kawaratsuka Kiln =

Kawaratsuka kiln ruins
- 瓦塚窯跡 (Japanese)
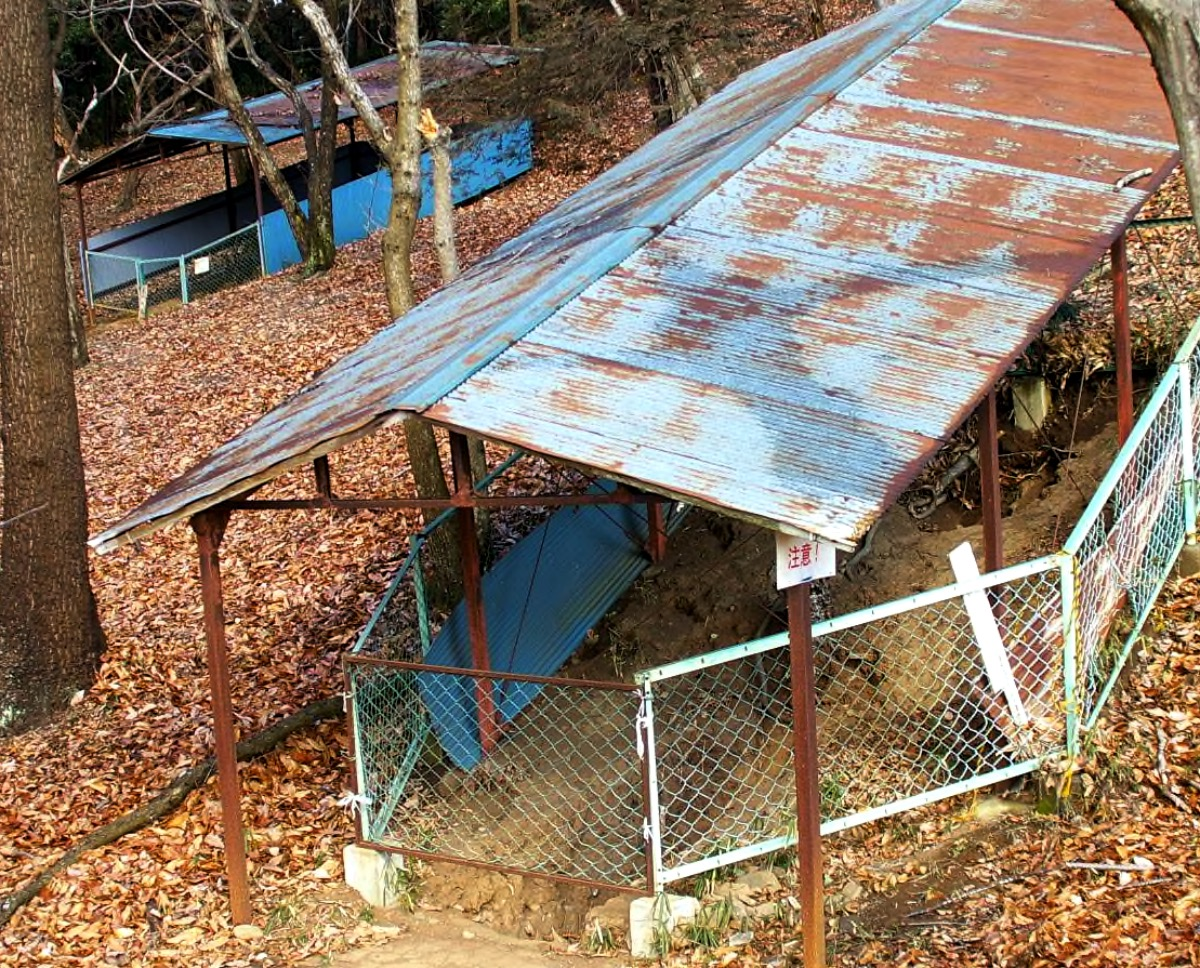
- Kawaratsuka kiln ruins

- Kawaratsuka kiln ruins Kawaratsuka Kiln (Japan)
- 36°16′30″N 140°13′11″E
- Periods: Kofun period
- Location: Ishioka, Ibaraki Japan
- Region: Kantō region

History
- Built: 7th century to 10th century AD

Site notes
- Public access: Yes (public park)

The Kawaratsuka kiln ruins (瓦塚窯跡, Kawaratsuka kama ato) is an archaeological site with the ruins of a Nara to Heian period factory for the production of earthenware, located in what is now the city of Ishioka in Ibaraki Prefecture in the northern Kantō region of Japan. It received protection as a National Historic Site in 2017.

== Overview ==
Kawara (瓦) roof tiles made of fired clay were introduced to Japan from Baekche during the 6th century along with Buddhism. During the 570s under the reign of Emperor Bidatsu, the king of Baekche sent six people to Japan skilled in various aspects of Buddhism, including a temple architect. Initially, tiled roofs were a sign of great wealth and prestige, and used for temple and government buildings. The material had the advantages of great strength and durability, and could also be made at locations around the country wherever clay was available.

The Kawarazuka kiln ruins were discovered during the clearing of an adjacent forest in 1968. An archaeological excavation found a total of 35 kilns across an area 130 meters north-to-south and 80 meters east-to-west. These kilns were made by hollowing out a clay hill to form an anagama-style staged kiln. Subsequent investigations found that one kiln was used for the production of Sue ware, whereas 34 kilns were specialized for roof tile production. An iron making furnace was also found in the area. From pottery shards found at site, it is likely that the kilns were the official kilns of Hitachi province and that tiles manufactured at the site were used in the construction of the provincial capital, Hitachi Kokubun-ji, Hitachi Kokubun-niji and the Baraki temple ruins, all of which date from around the Tenpyō era, or approximately 741 AD. The kilns remained in use through the first half of the 10th century.

The site was designated a Prefectural Historic Site in 1937 and was raised to national status in 2017.

== See also ==
- List of Historic Sites of Japan (Ibaraki)
