= Kyōzō =

Japanese Buddhist Architecture

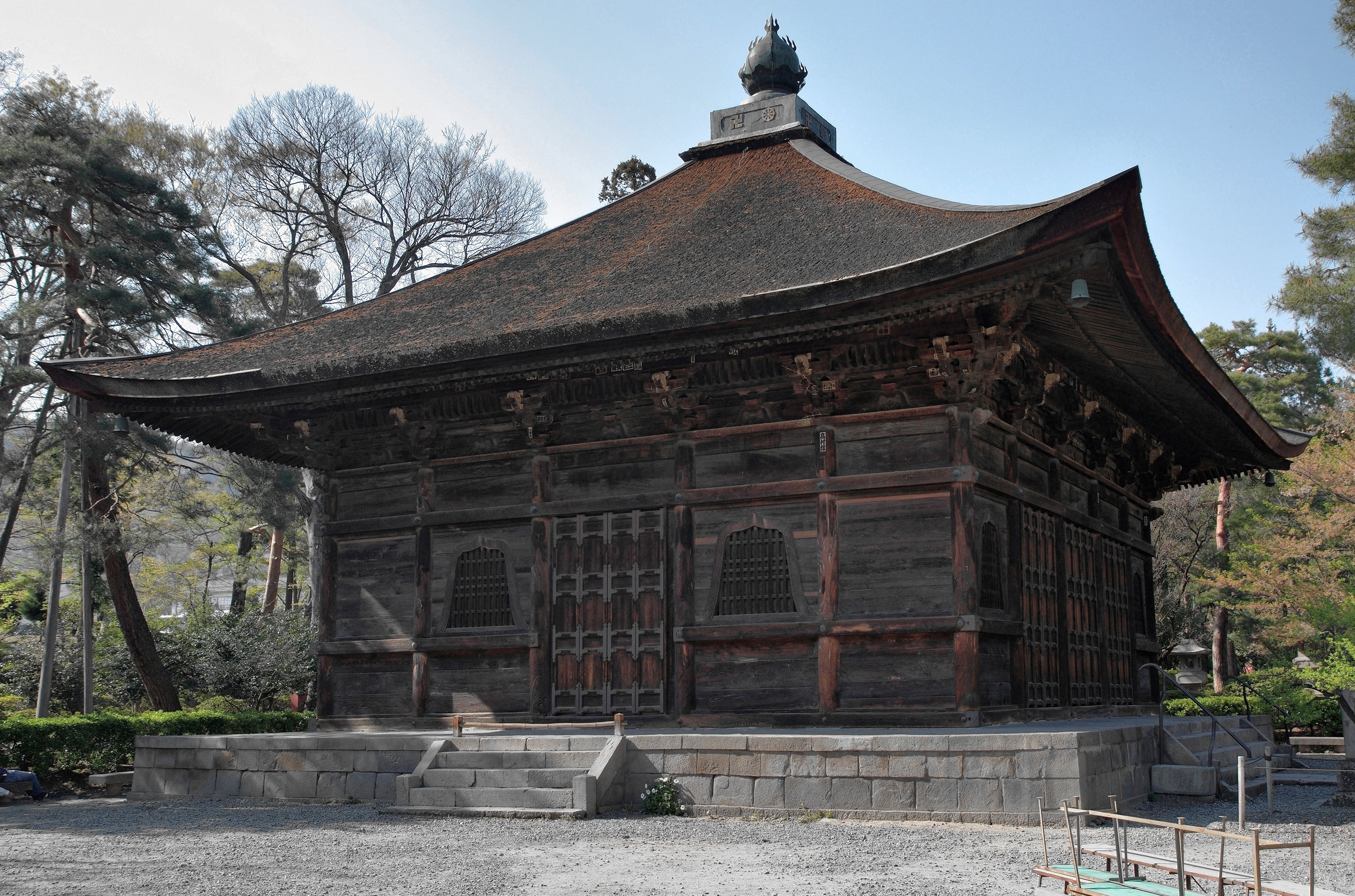
The kyōzō of Zenkō-ji temple

Kyōzō (経蔵) in Japanese Buddhist architecture is a repository for sūtras and chronicles of the temple history. It is also called kyōko (経庫), kyō-dō (経堂), or zōden (蔵殿). In ancient times the kyōzō was placed opposite the belfry on the east–west axis of the temple. The earliest extant kyōzō is at Hōryū-ji, and it is a two-storied structure. An example of one-storied kyōzō is at Tōshōdai-ji in Nara. A kyōzō's usual size is 3 x 3 ken.

All storage buildings are equipped with shelving to store the containers that hold the rolled sūtras. Some temples have circular revolving shelves for sūtra storage: a central pillar revolves, like a vertical axle, and octahedral tubes are attached to it. A revolving sūtra storage case is called rinzō (輪蔵, wheel repository). Revolving shelves are convenient because they allow priests and monks to select the needed sūtra quickly. Eventually, in some kyōzō the faithful were permitted to push the shelves around the pillar while praying—it was believed that they could receive religious edification without reading the sūtras.

Some scripture houses are National Treasures of Japan:

- The kyōzō of Tōshōdai-ji
- The kyōzō of Hōryū-ji
- The kyōzō of Ankoku-ji

== Gallery ==
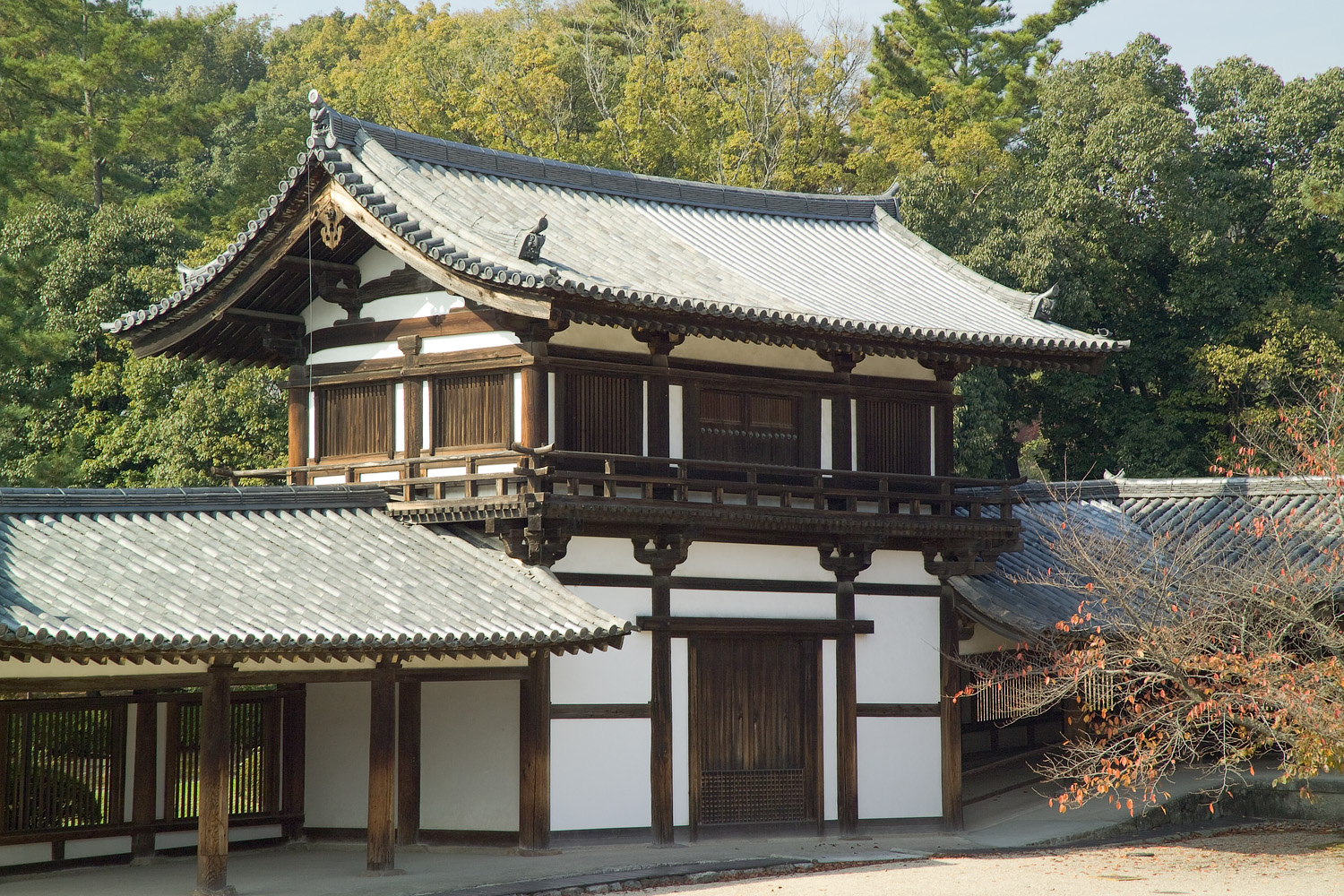
The kyōzō at Hōryū-ji, 8th century

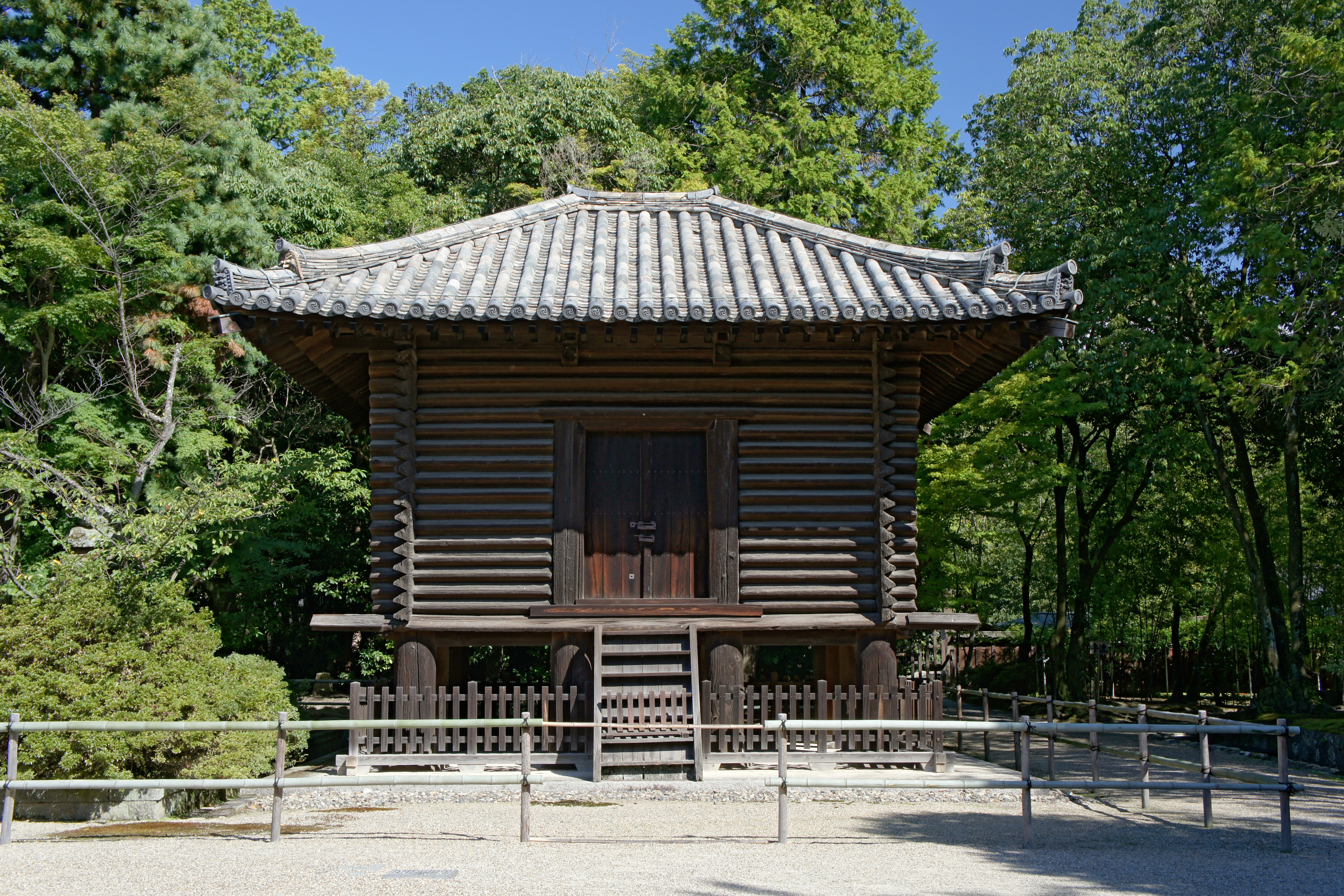
The kyōzō at Tōshōdai-ji, 8th century

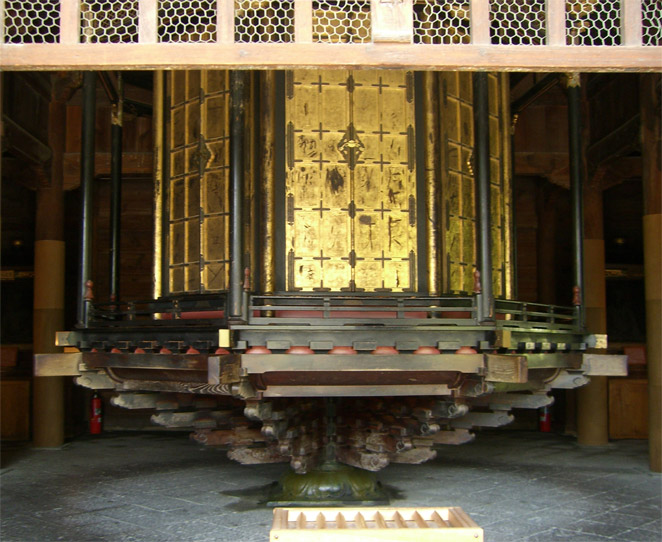
Revolving shelves at Zenkō-ji

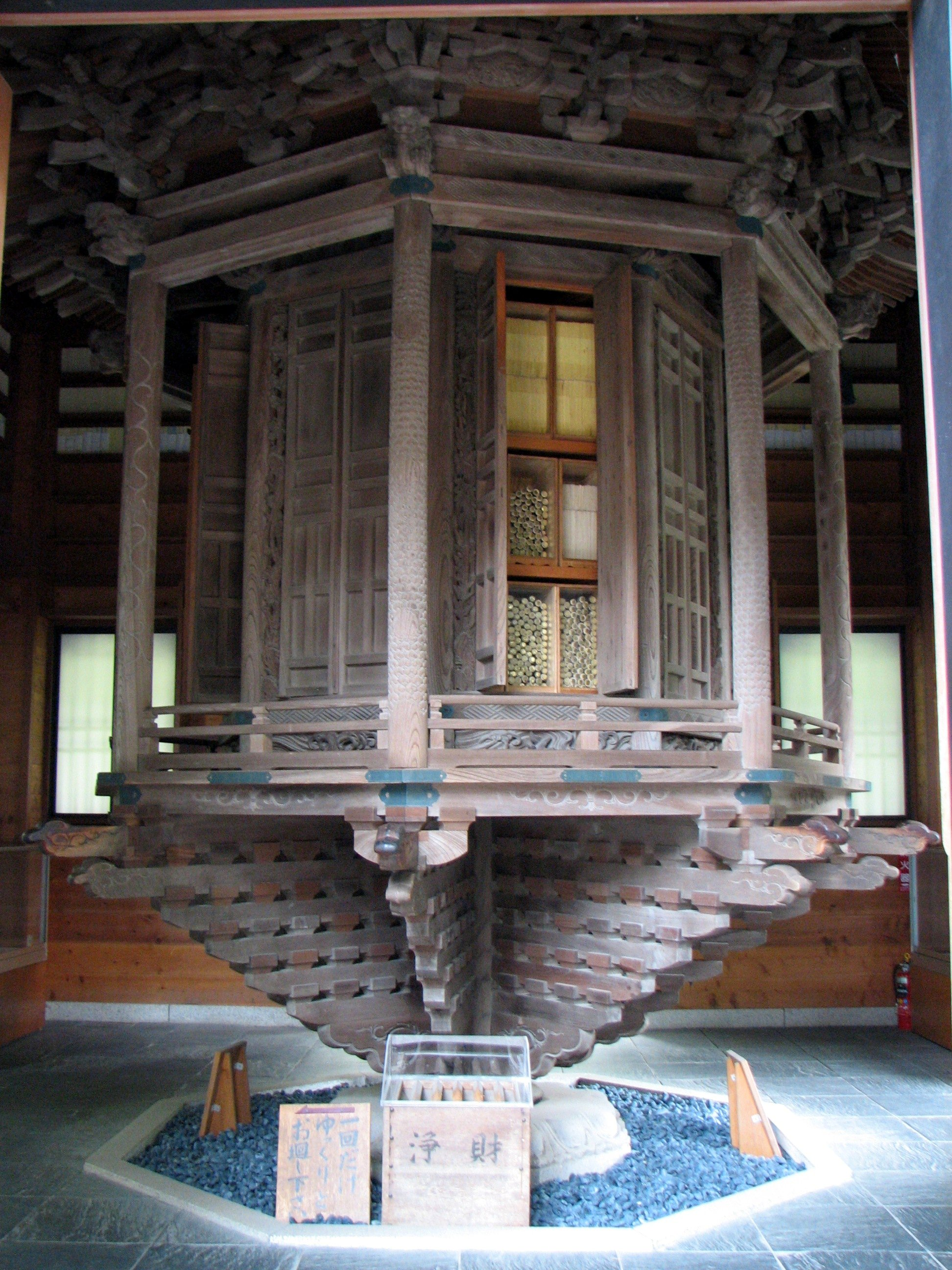
Rinzō at Hase-dera
