= Zenkō-ji (Tokyo) =

- 南命山無量寿院善光寺
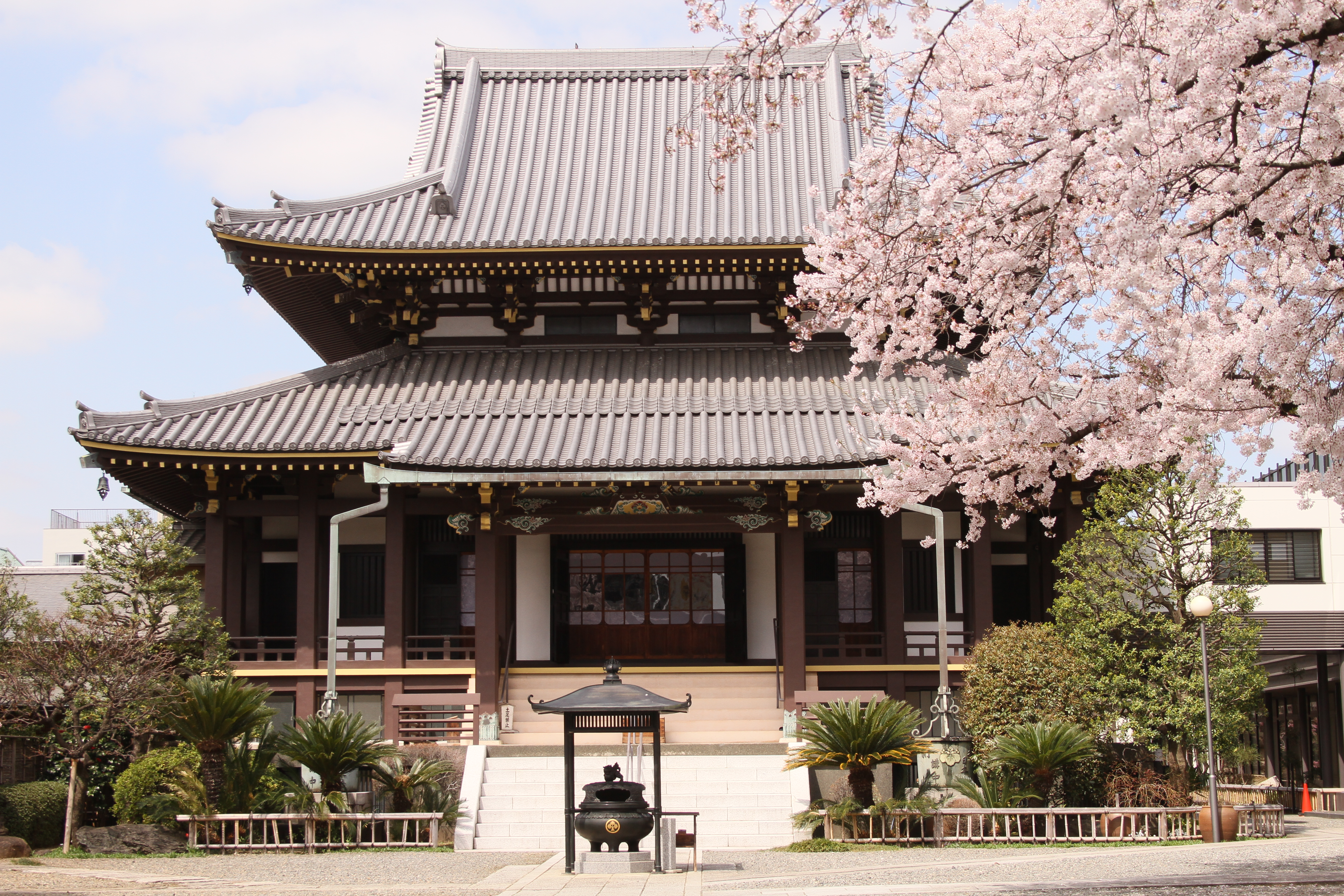
- The temple's exterior in 2015

- Location within Japan

Religion
- Affiliation: Jōdo-shū
- Deity: Amitābha

Location
- Location: 3-5-17 Kita-Aoyama, Minato, Tokyo
- Country: Japan
- Coordinates: 35.6665°N 139.712347°E

Several scenes inside Zenkō-ji, 2013

Zenkō-ji (善光寺, Temple of the Benevolent Light) is a Buddhist temple in Minato, Tokyo, Japan.

== Temple grounds ==
=== Buildings ===
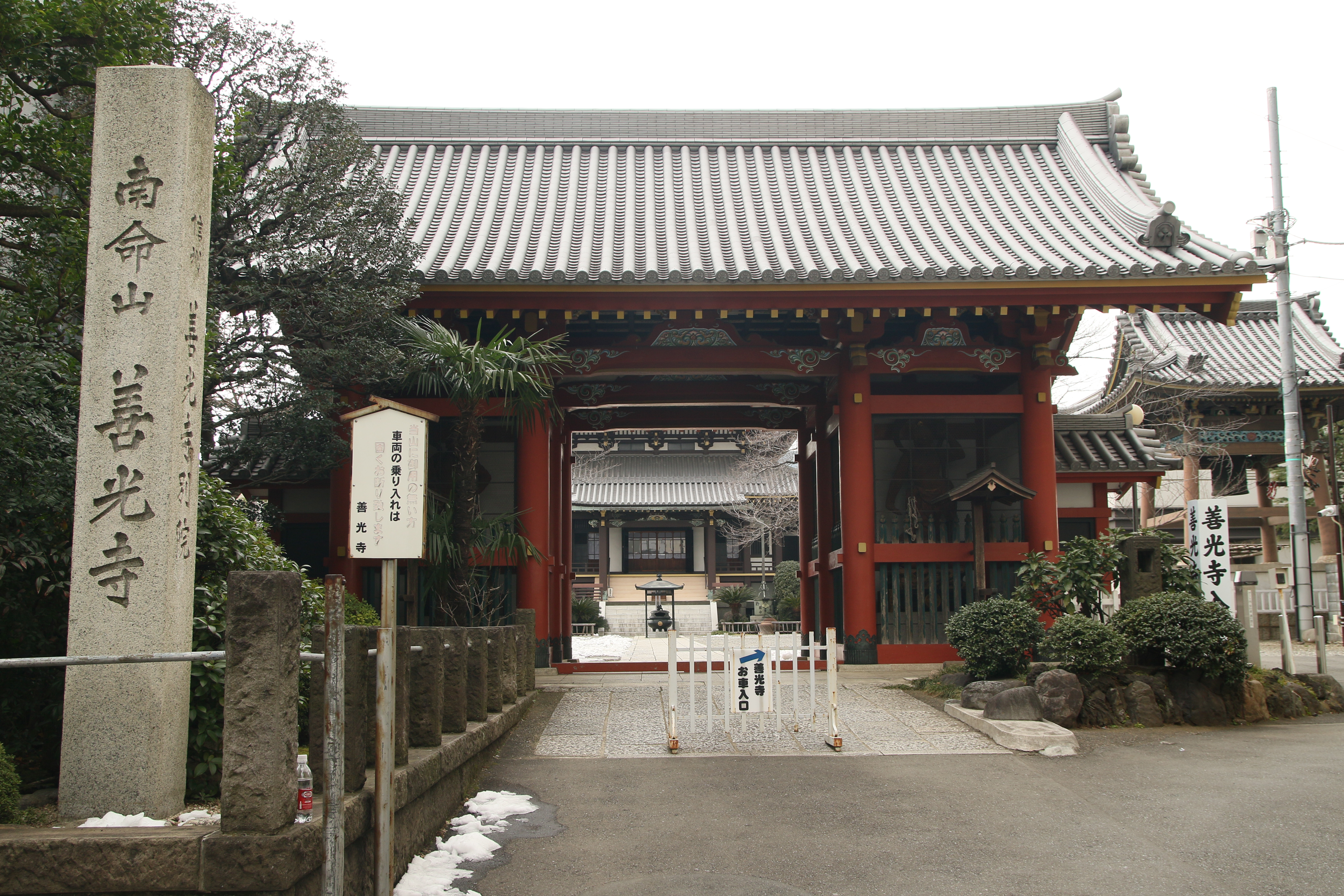
Entrance Gate

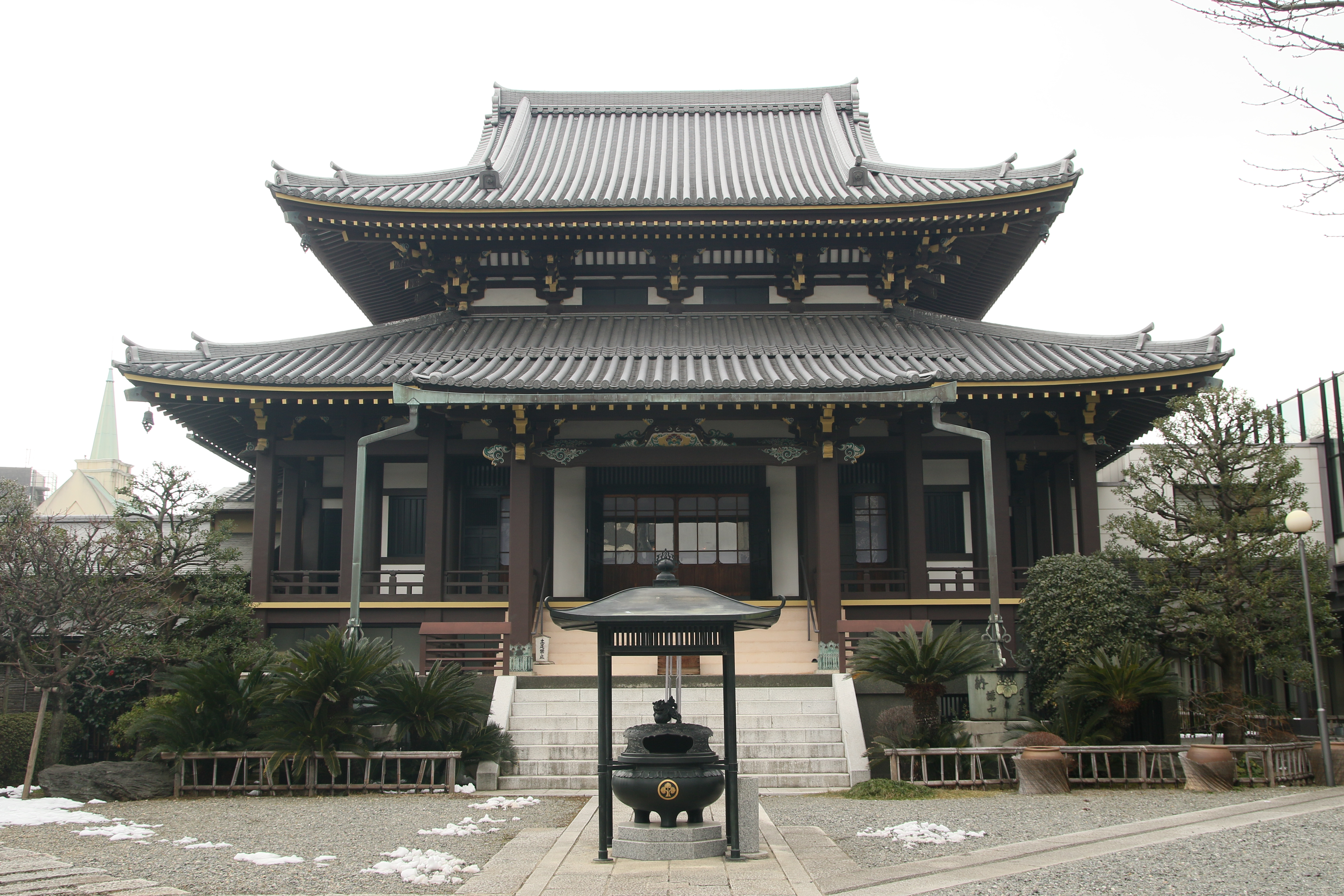
Main Hall

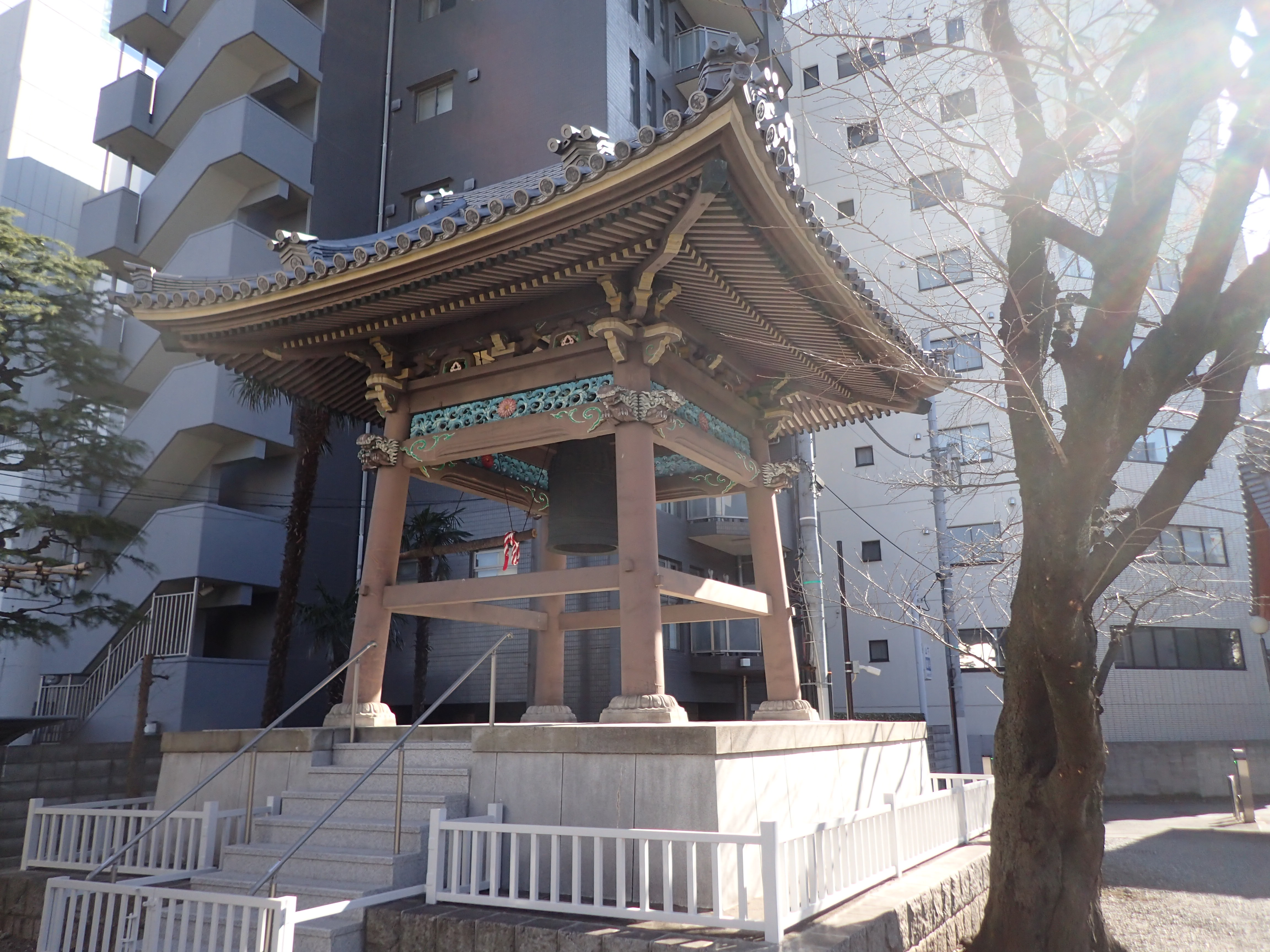
Shōrō

=== Others ===
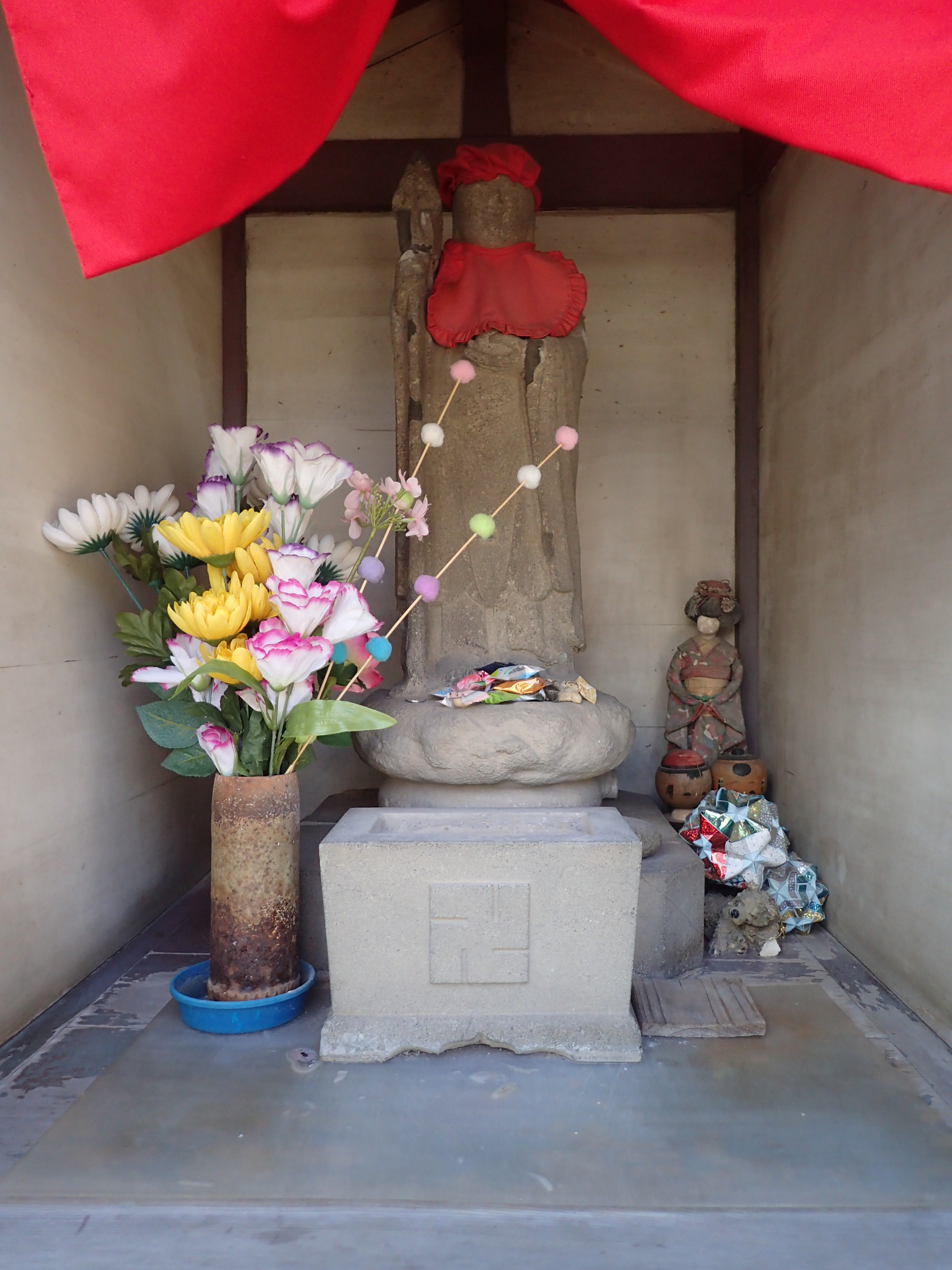
Jizō

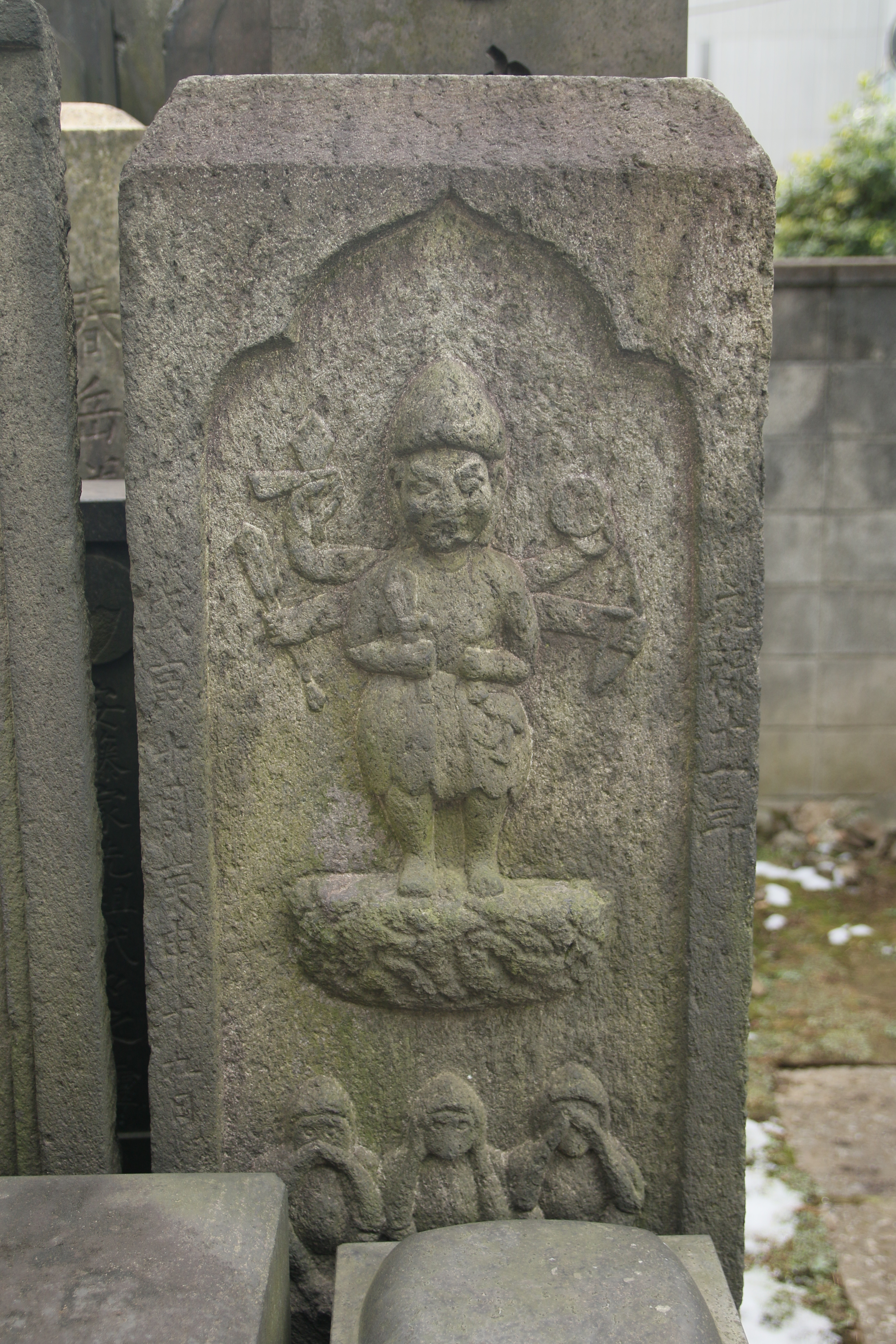
Kōshin-tō

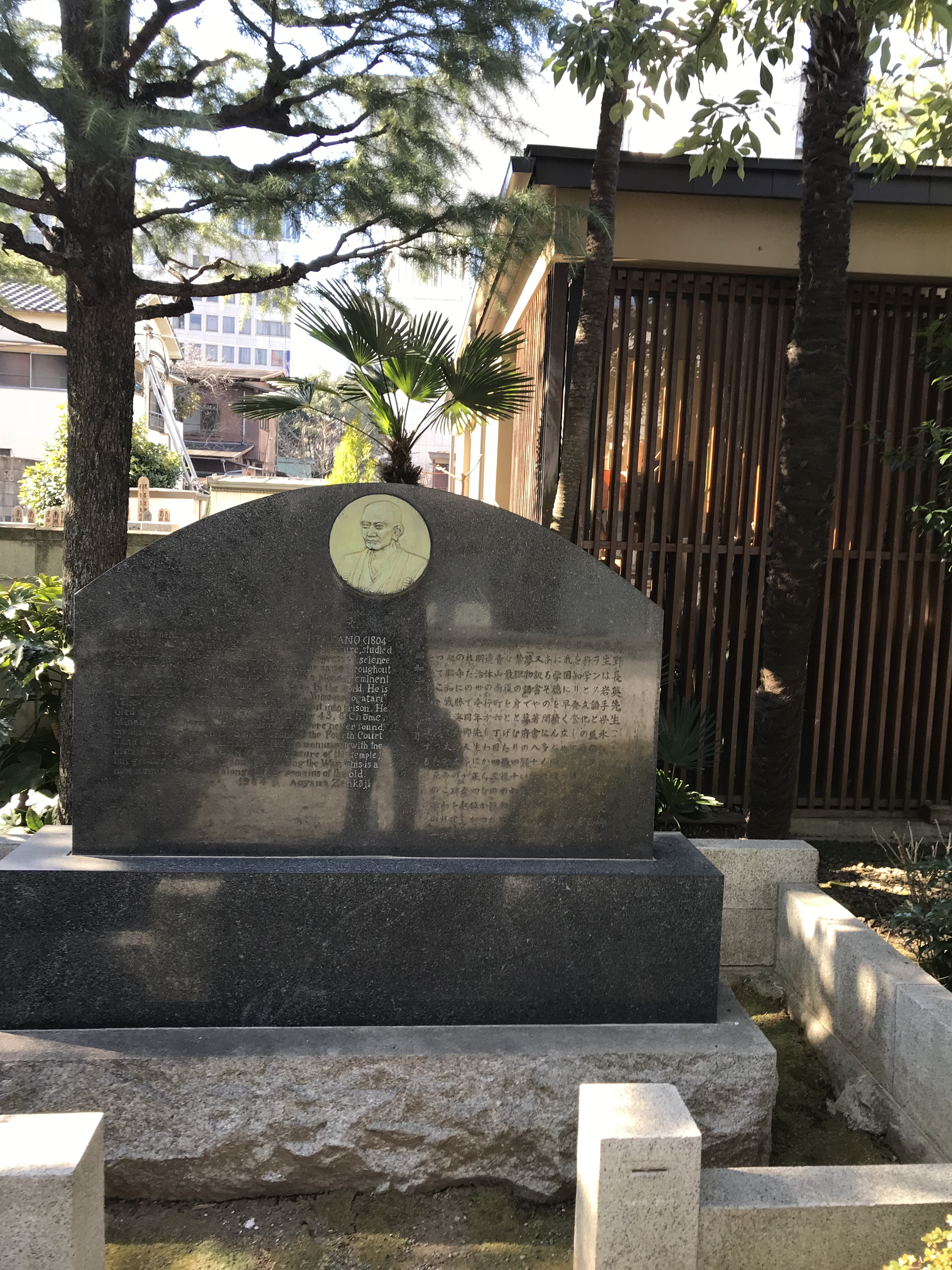
Stele of Takano Chōei

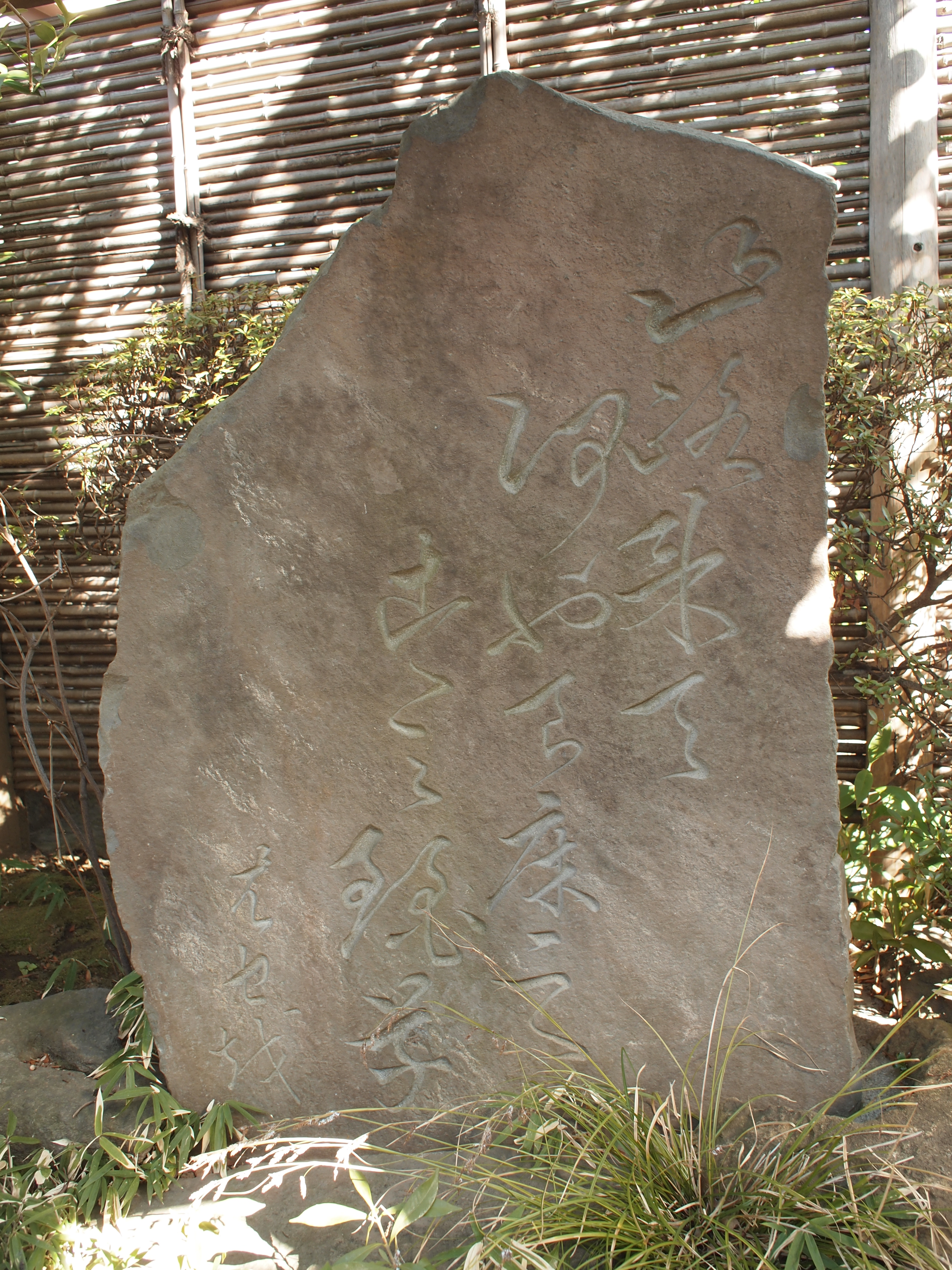
Haiku Monument of Matsuo Bashō

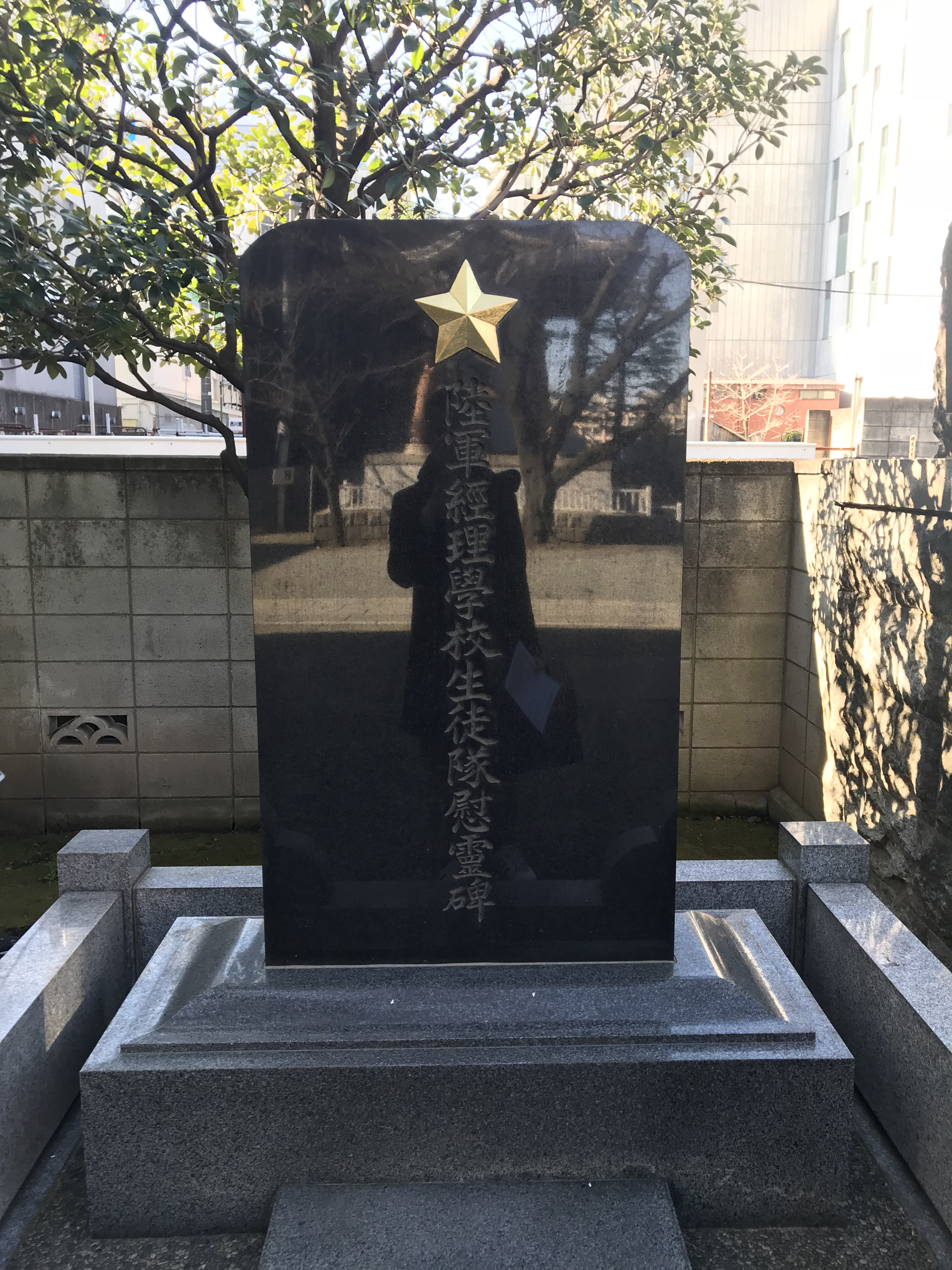
Cenotaph for Students of Army Financial Management School

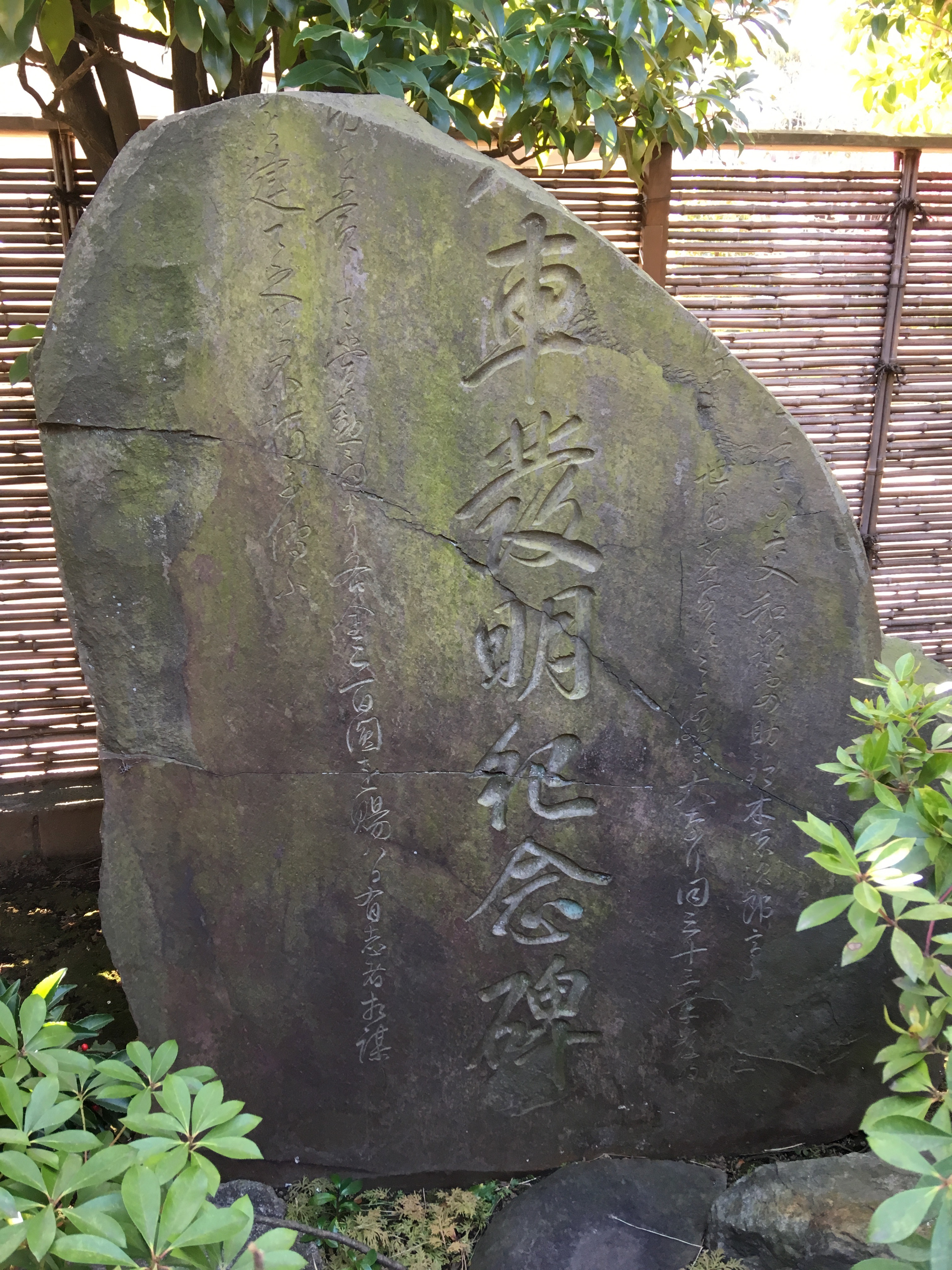
Stele of Rickshaw Invention
