= Zenkō-ji =

Buddhist temple in Nagano, Japan

- 善光寺
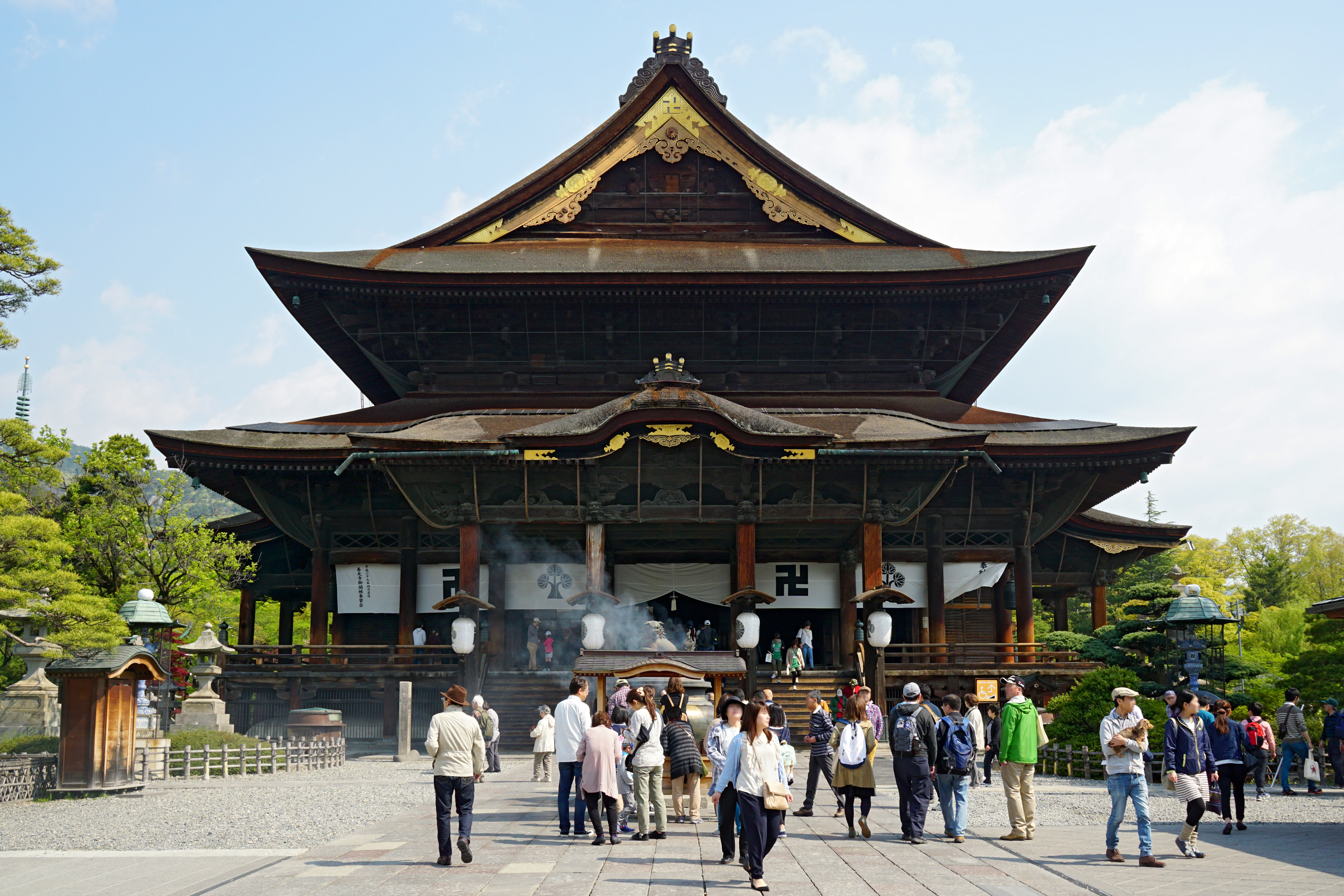
- The Main Hall, 2016

- Location within Nagano Prefecture Location within Japan

Religion
- Affiliation: Buddhist
- Deity: Amida Buddha
- Rite: Tendai and Jōdo
- Status: functional

Location
- Location: Nagano, Nagano Prefecture
- Country: Japan
- Coordinates: 36°39′42″N 138°11′16″E

Architecture
- Founder: unknown
- Completed: 7th century AD

Website
- Official website

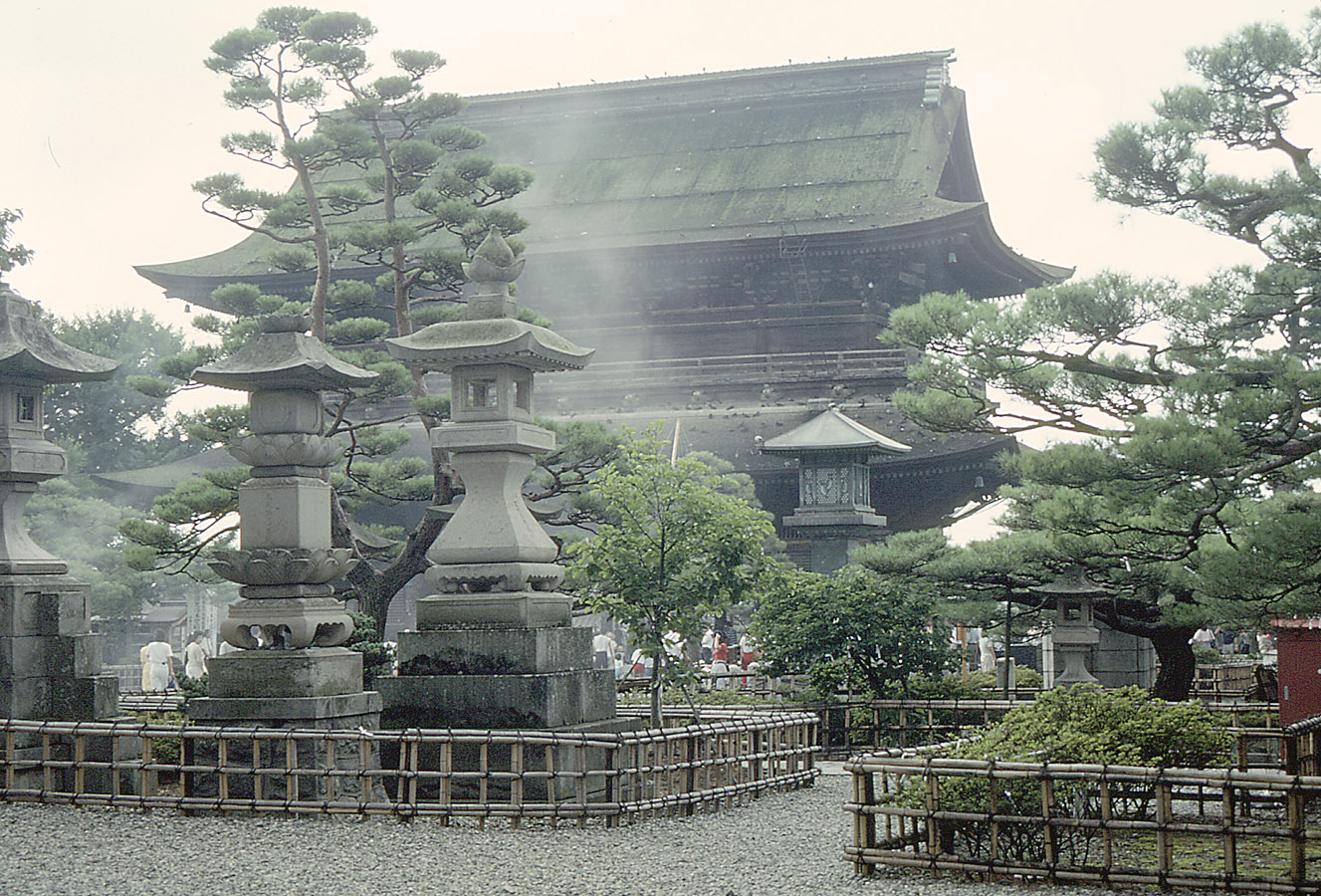
The Gardens of Zenkō-ji, 2004

Zenkō-ji (善光寺, Temple of the Benevolent Light) is a Buddhist temple located in the city of Nagano, Japan. The temple was built in the 7th century. It is one of the few remaining pilgrimage sites in Japan. The modern city of Nagano began as a town built around the temple.

Zenkō-ji was founded before Buddhism in Japan split into several different sects. It currently belongs to both the Tendai and Jōdoshū schools of Mahayana Buddhism, and is co-managed by twenty-five priests from the former school, and fourteen from the latter. The temple enshrines images of the Amida Buddha. According to legend, the image, having caused dispute between two clans, was dumped into a canal. It was later rescued by Honda Yoshimitsu. The temple was thus named "Zenkō," according to the Chinese transliteration of Yoshimitsu's name.

The main Buddhist image is a hibutsu (secret Buddha), a hidden Buddha statue, not shown to the public. This hibutsu is rumored to be the first Buddha statue to ever be brought to Japan. The commandments of the temple require the absolute secrecy of the statue, prohibiting it to be shown to anyone, including the chief priest of the temple. However, a replica of the statue (Maedachi Honzon) has been created which can be shown publicly once every six years in spring, in a ceremony called Gokaichō. This event attracts many worshippers and visitors. When the statue was on display in 2003, Zenkō-ji cooperated with Motozenkō-ji and Zenkō-ji of Kofu, Yamanashi Prefecture. The most recent display of "Maedachi Honzon" lasted from the beginning of April to the end of June, 2022. It was originally scheduled to be displayed in 2021 but was delayed due to the COVID-19 pandemic. The public showing period was also extended from the originally planned 57 days to 88 days with the goal of curbing the number of concurrent visitors.

The temple contains a statue of Binzuru, a physician who was said to be Buddha's follower. Visitors to the temple touch the statue in order to cure their ailments. The temple also contains an inner prayer chamber, accessible to visitors. Currently, a daily morning ritual is held there by the high priest or priestess. From the inner chamber, a narrow staircase leads down to a completely dark corridor. In this corridor worshippers try to touch a metal key hanging on the wall, in order to gain enlightenment. The key represents the Key to the Western Paradise of the Amida Buddha.

In the battles between Uesugi Kenshin and Takeda Shingen in the 16th century, Zenkō-ji served as one of Kenshin's bases of operations.

== History ==
According to the explanation of Zenkō-ji, the Hibutsu, or the main hidden icon, of Zenkō-ji, moved from India to Japan by way of the Korean peninsula, in the 6th century, during the reign of Emperor Kinmei. Afterwards, it was moved several times before coming to rest at its present location in Nagano city.

At the end of the Kamakura period (1185–1333), many temples copied Zenkō-ji's famous Buddha statue, and many new temples were built around the country, calling themselves "Zenkō-ji" or "Shin-Zenkō-ji" ("New Zenkō-ji").

In the Sengoku period (mid-15th to 17th century), when the Zenkō-ji became embroiled in the struggles between Uesugi Kenshin and Takeda Shingen, the chief abbot was afraid it would be burnt to the ground. He built a new Zenkō-ji in what is now Kōfu; it stands to this day.

In 1598, Toyotomi Hideyoshi moved the hibutsu to Kyoto, and then to Shinano. The hibutsu and the Zenkō-ji temple structure have since been moved back to Nagano.

Zenkō-ji temple decided to pull out of the 2008 Summer Olympics torch relay, in relation with the 2008 Tibetan unrest and in solidarity with the Tibetan Buddhists. The Zenkō-ji temple was then vandalized.

== Inside the compound ==
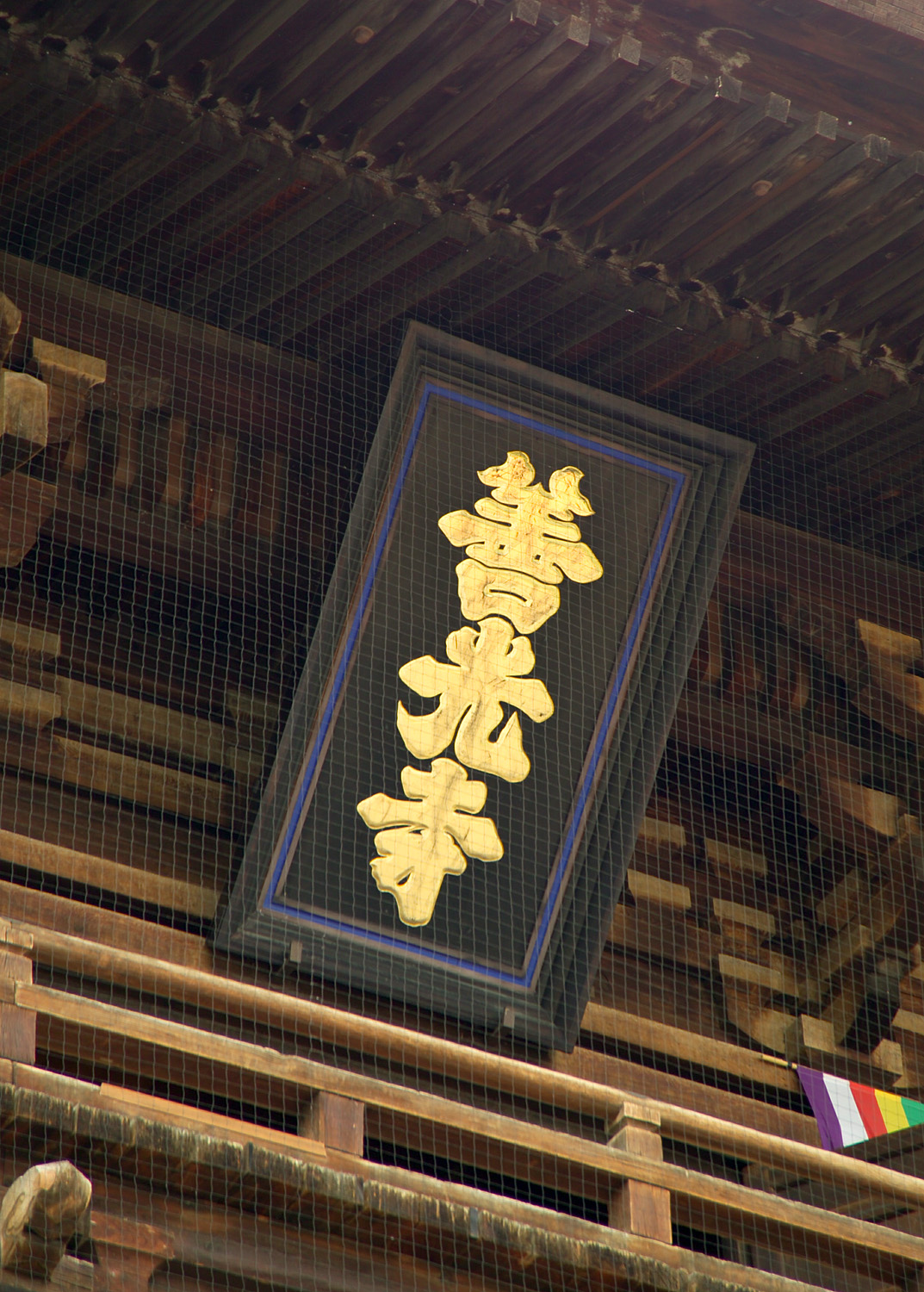
The name of the temple. This plaque, with calligraphy by an Imperial prince, is on the sanmon.

The Zenkō-ji compound contains many interesting and historically significant buildings. The compound is arranged in a linear fashion, from the south to the north, so that worshipers and visitors would likely see the buildings in this order. Admission to most of the buildings at the compound is covered by a ticket which costs ¥500. The ticket can be re-used at different buildings.

=== Daihongan ===
Immediately on the left, from the southern entrance, this Jōdo Sect temple houses the nunnery and the residence of the high priestess.

=== Niōmon ===
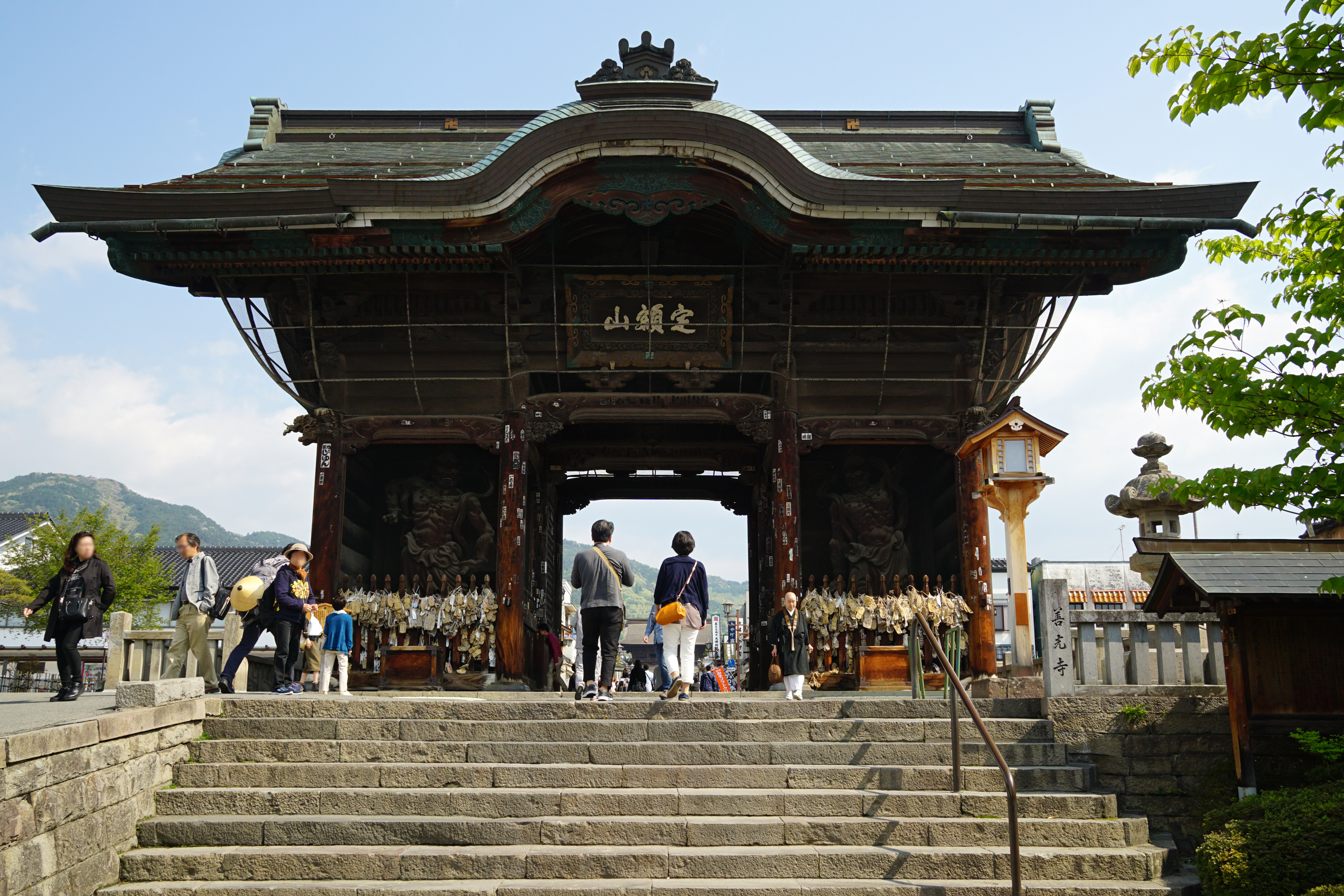
The Niōmon Gate, 2007

The Niōmon gate features two impressive Niō guardians, which protect the compound from enemies of Buddhism. The two statues were reconstructed in 1918 after a fire.

=== Original Main Hall ===
The original Main Hall is located on the left, after the Niōmon gate.

=== Daikanjin ===
Located on the left, after the original Main Hall site, this Tendai Sect temple houses the residence of the chief priest. The temple's compound contains a garden and a treasure house, which contains the illustrated scroll of The Tale of Genji. These areas are not open for public viewing.

=== Rokujizō ===
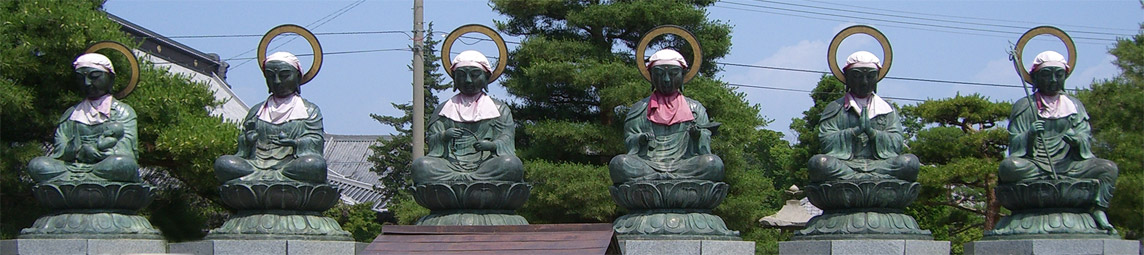
The Rokujizō

The Rokujizō are located to the right of the Daikanjin. The Rokujizō are statues of the six Bodhisattvas, who gave up Buddhist enlightenment, in order to provide salvation to others. The Bodhisattvas are said to be able to commune with the six realms of hell, starvation, beasts, carnage, human beings, and divine beings.

=== Sanmon ===
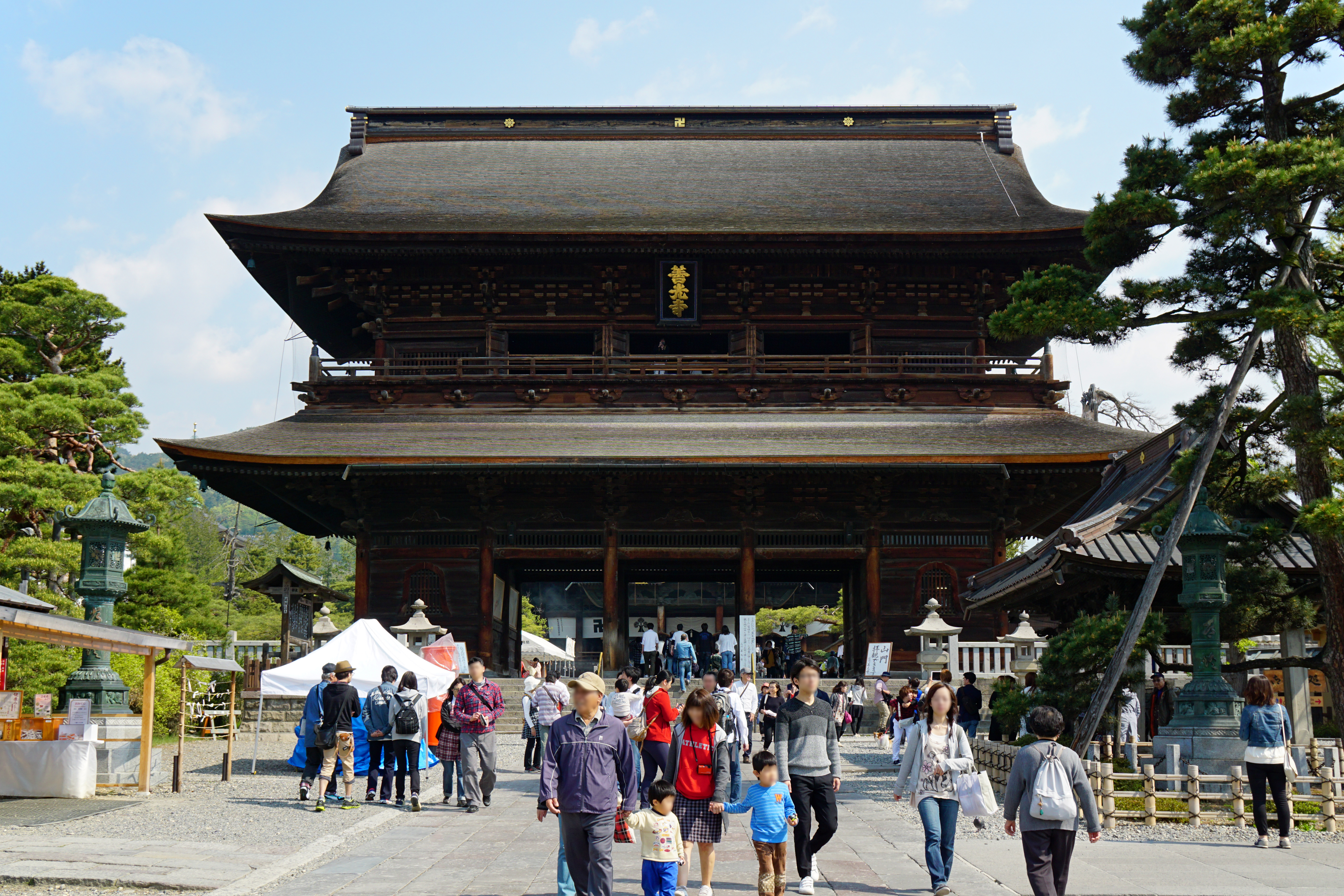
The Sanmon Gate

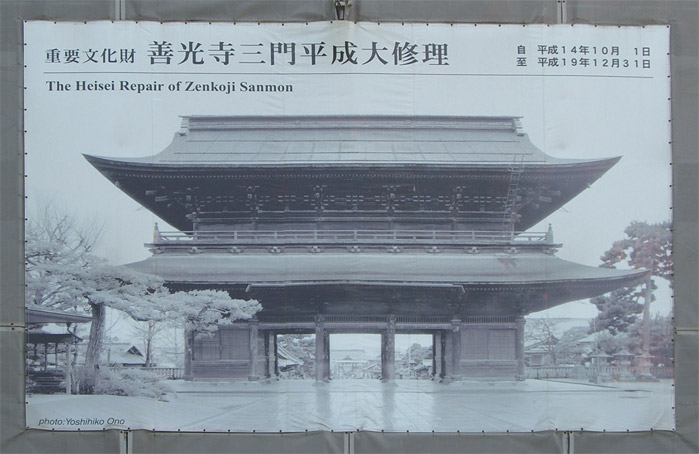
The Sanmon Gate Reconstruction Poster

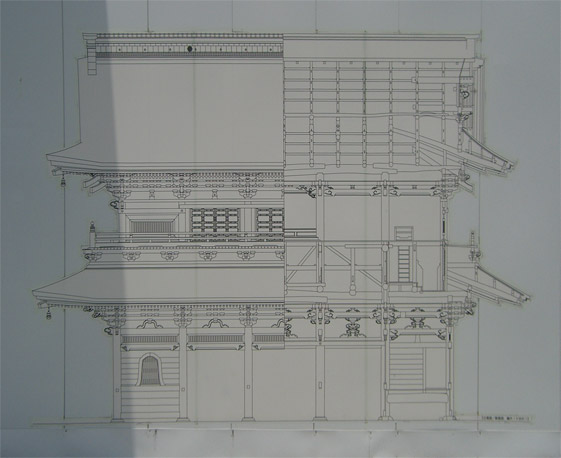
The Sanmon Gate Reconstruction Schematic (Side View)

The Sanmon Gate is considered an Important Cultural Property. It contains five wooden Buddhist statues (not available for public viewing), as well as a plaque with calligraphy by the Imperial prince, which is said to contain five hidden doves in the lettering. Reconstruction of the Sanmon Gate began on October 1, 2002 and was scheduled to end on December 31, 2007.

=== Kyōzō ===
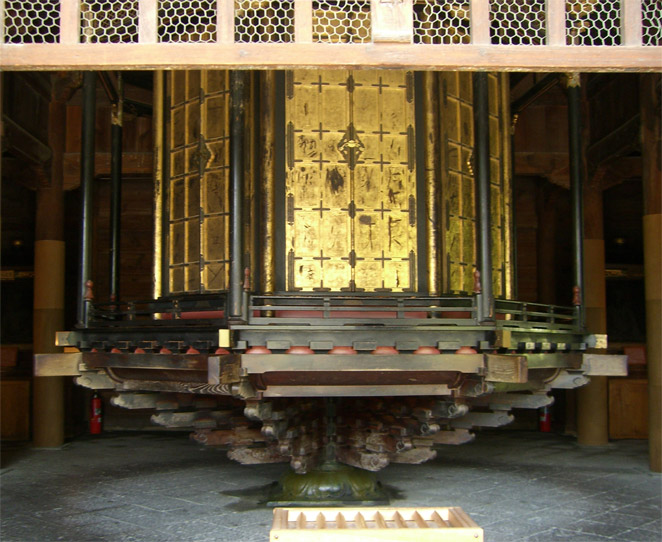
The Kyōzō

The Kyōzō is located on the far left from the Sanmon Gate. It is also an Important Cultural Property. The building contains a repository of printed Buddhist sutras, and visitors get to rotate the octagonal sūtra holder, in order to gain enlightenment. The Kyōzō was constructed in 1759, although the sūtra holder was made in 1694.

=== Zenkō-ji Hon-dō ===
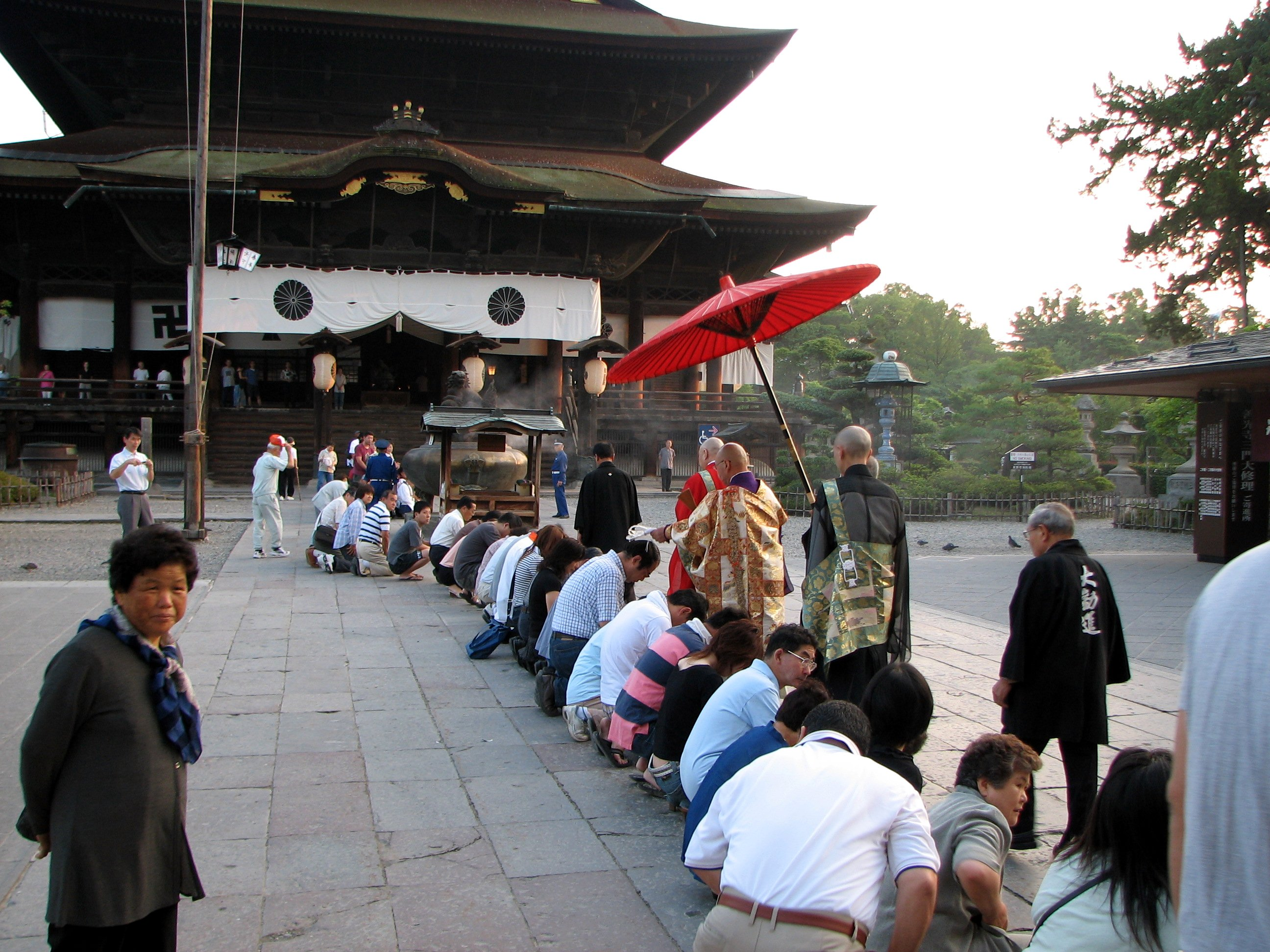
A high priest dispensing blessings at the Zenkō-ji Hondō.

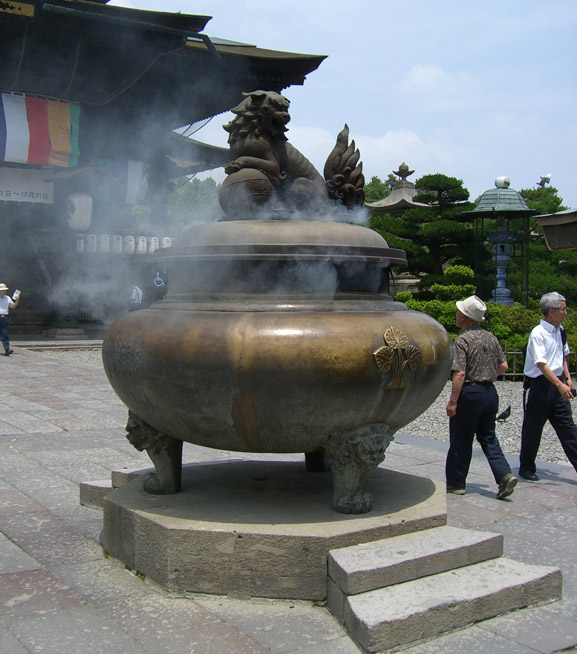
The incense burner in front of Zenkō-ji. Visitors rub the incense smoke on their bodies for good health and fortune. A high priest or priestess holds early-morning blessing ceremonies here.

This is the Main Hall, located at the northern end of the compound. It is considered a National Treasure.
