= Japanese Buddhist architecture =

Architecture of Buddhist temples in Japan

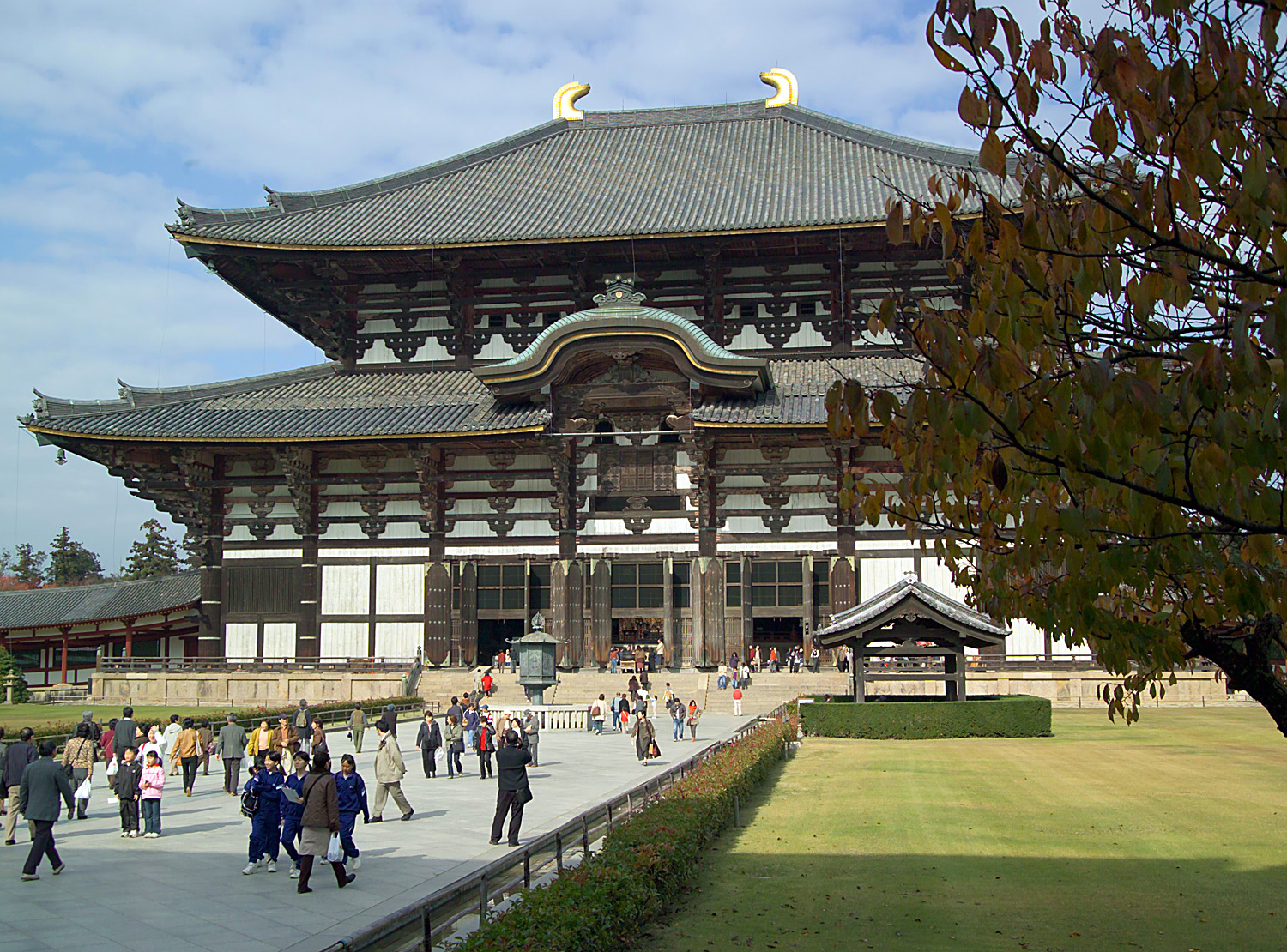

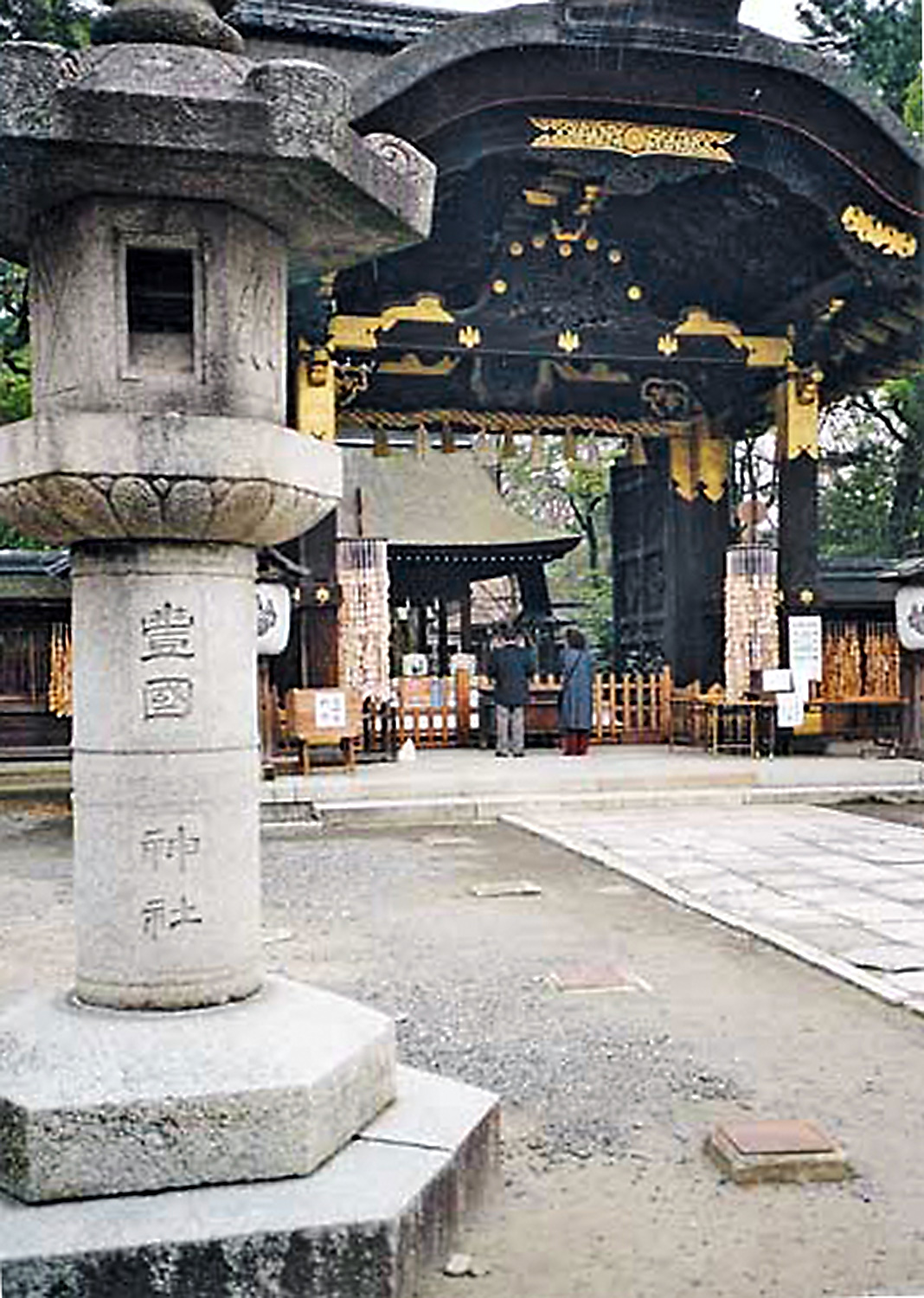

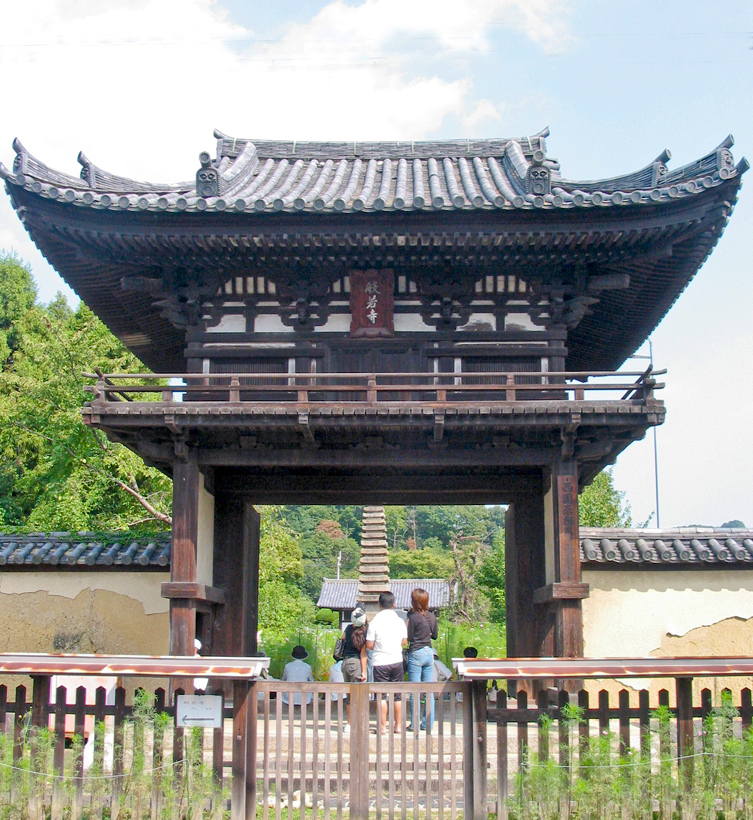

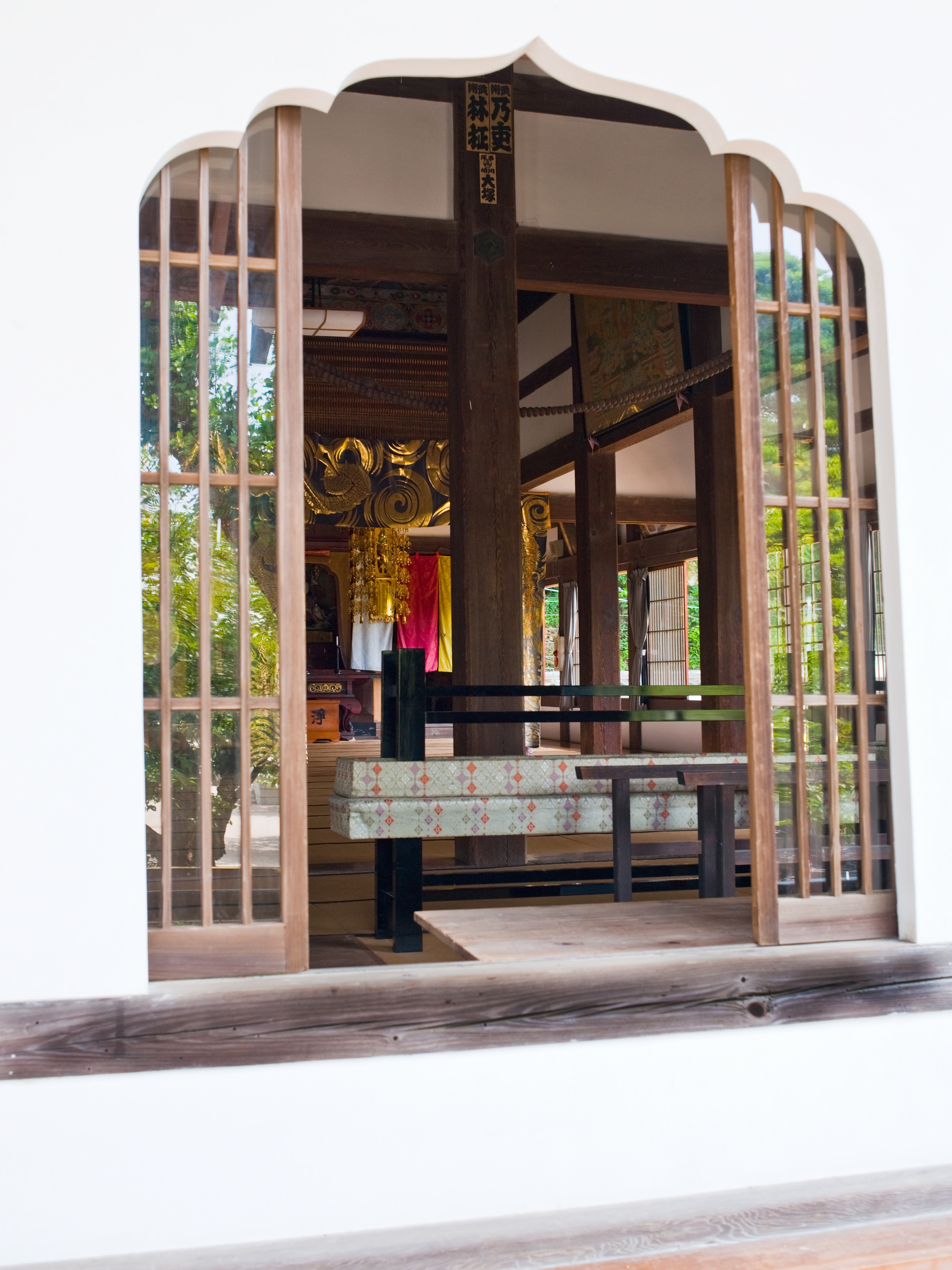

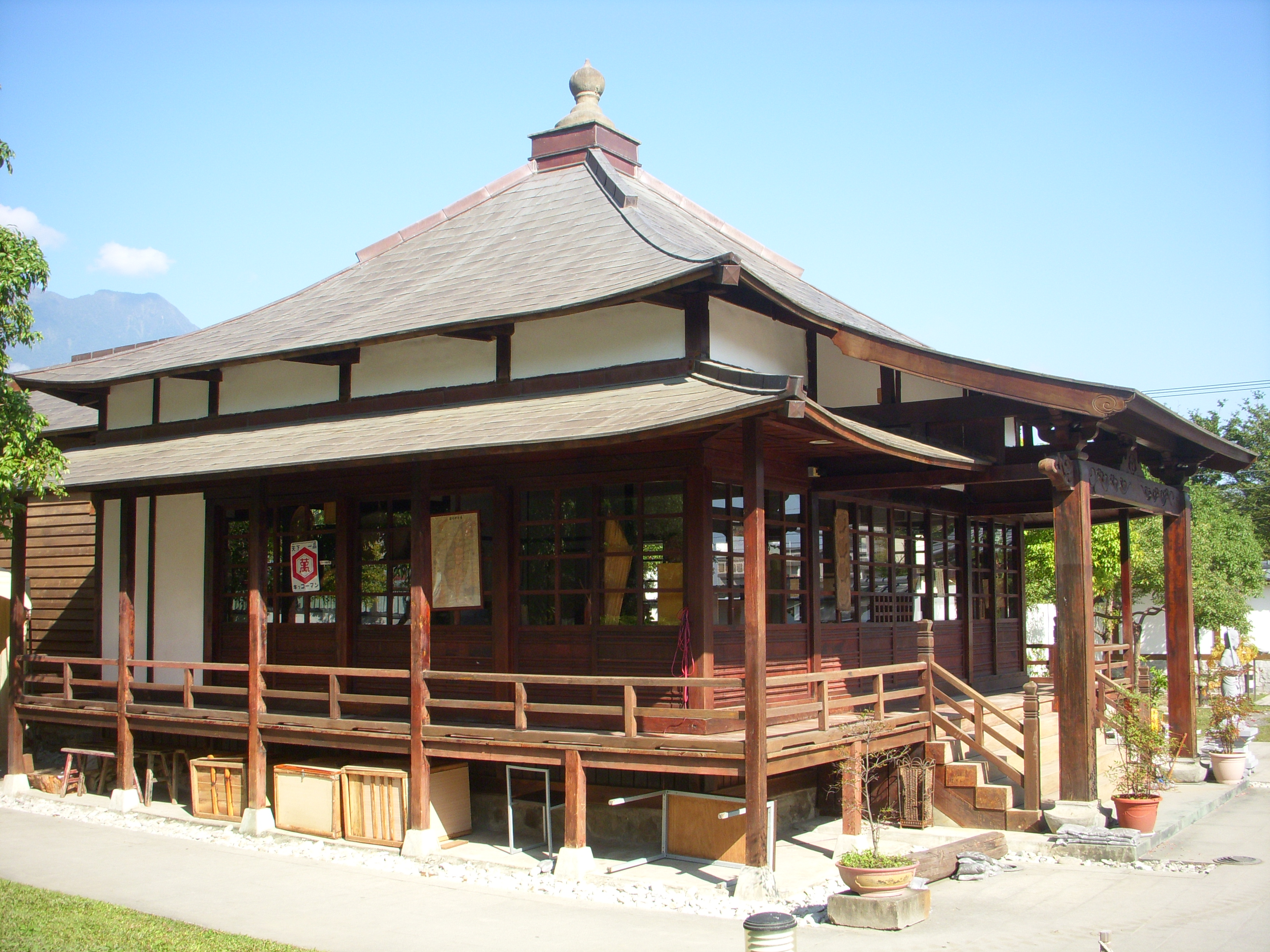

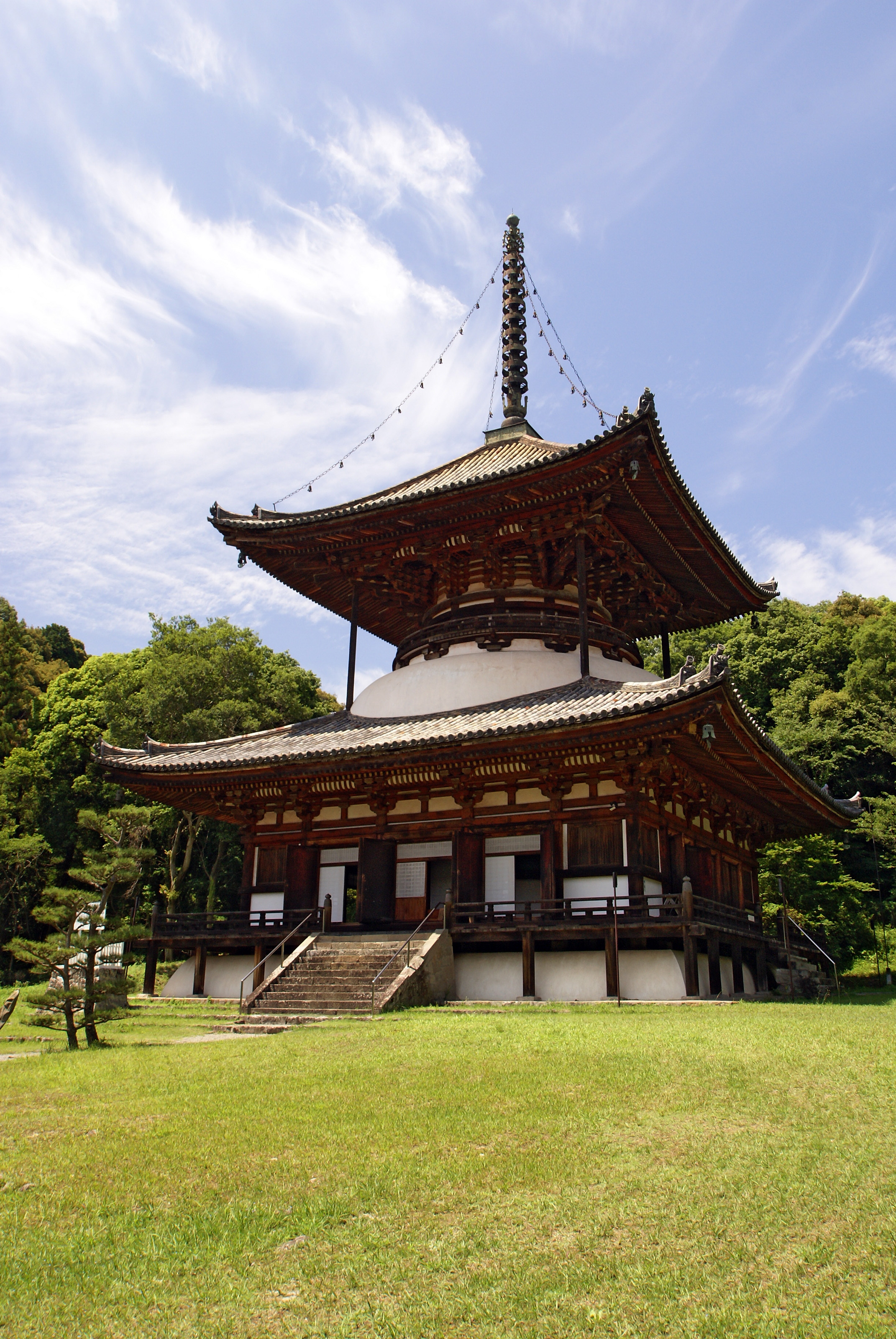

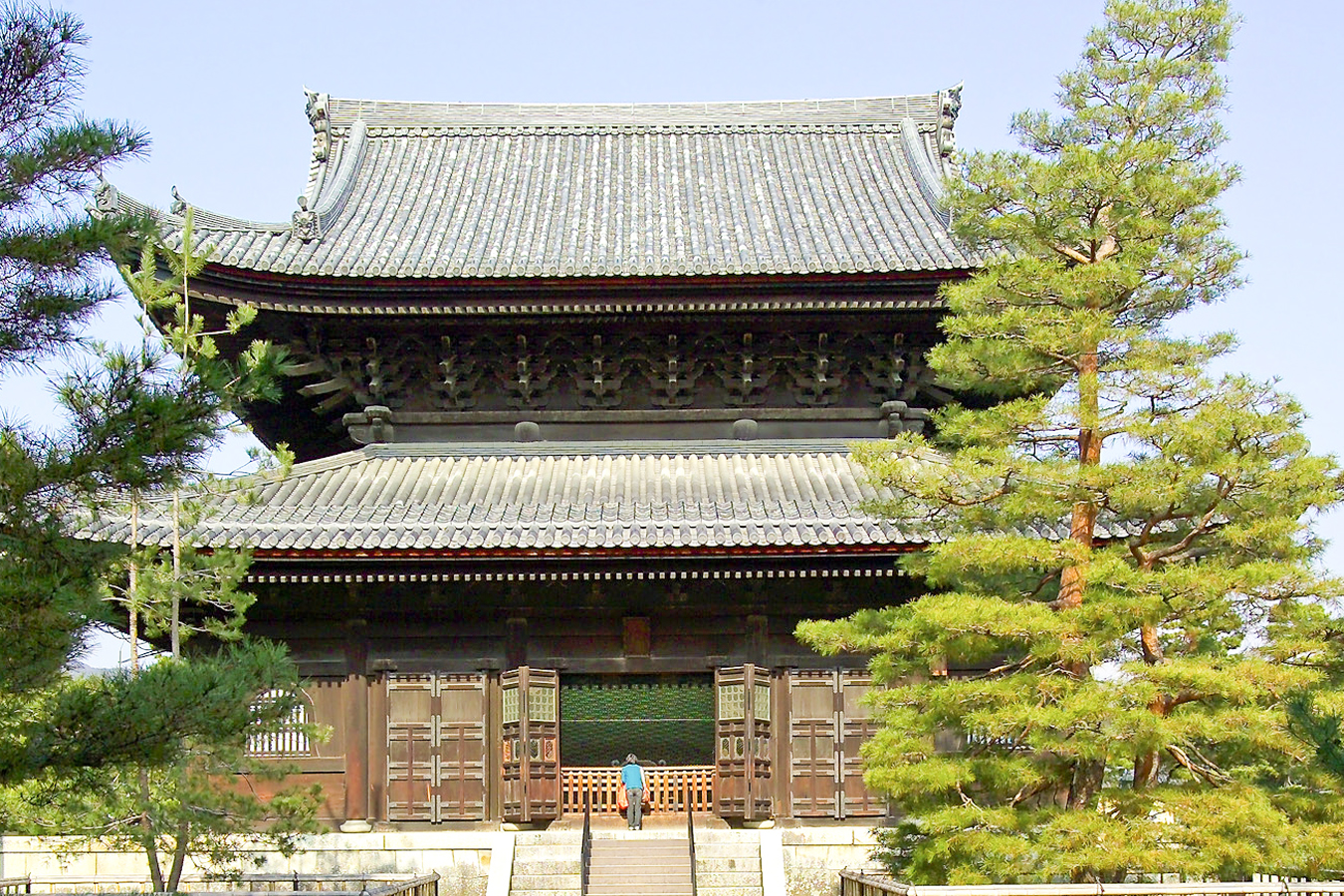

Examples of Buddhist architecture in Japan

Japanese Buddhist architecture is the architecture of Buddhist temples in Japan, consisting of locally developed variants of architectural styles born in China. After Buddhism arrived from the continent via the Three Kingdoms of Korea in the 6th century, an effort was initially made to reproduce the original buildings as faithfully as possible, but gradually local versions of continental styles were developed both to meet Japanese tastes and to solve problems posed by local weather, which is more rainy and humid than in China.

The first Buddhist sects were Nara's six Nanto Rokushū (南都六宗, Nara six sects), (Note: The six sects were called Sanron-, Jōjitsu-, Hossō-, Kusha-, Ritsu-, and Kegon-shū.) followed during the Heian period by Kyoto's Shingon and Tendai. Later, during the Kamakura period, in Kamakura were born the Jōdo and the native Japanese sect Nichiren-shū. At roughly the same time, Zen Buddhism arrived from China, strongly influencing all other sects in many ways, including in architecture. The social composition of Buddhism's followers also changed radically with time. Beginning as an elite religion, it slowly spread from the nobility to warriors and merchants, and finally to the population at large. On the technical side, new woodworking tools like the framed pit saw (Note: For an image of a framed pit saw, see here) and the plane allowed new architectural solutions.

Buddhist temples and Shinto shrines share their basic characteristics and often differ only in details that the non-specialist may not notice. This similarity is because the sharp division between Buddhist temples and Shinto shrines (Note: The term "Shinto shrine" is used in opposition to "Buddhist temple" to mirror in English the distinction made in Japanese between Shinto and Buddhist religious structures. In Japanese the first are called jinja (神社), the second tera (寺).) is recent, dating to the Meiji period's policy of separation of Buddhism and Shinto (Shinbutsu bunri) of 1868. Before the Meiji Restoration it was common for a Buddhist temple to be built inside or next to a shrine, or for a shrine to include Buddhist sub-temples. If a shrine housed a Buddhist temple, it was called a jingū-ji (神宮寺, lit. shrine temple). Analogously, temples all over Japan used to adopt tutelary kami (chinju (鎮守/鎮主) and built shrines within their precincts to house them. After the forcible separation of temples and shrines ordered by the new government, the connection between the two religions was officially severed, but continued nonetheless in practice and is still visible today.

Buddhist architecture in Japan during the country's whole history has absorbed much of the best available natural and human resources. Particularly between the 8th and the 16th centuries, it led the development of new structural and ornamental features. For these reasons, its history is vital to the understanding of not only Buddhist architecture itself, but also of Japanese art in general.

== General features ==
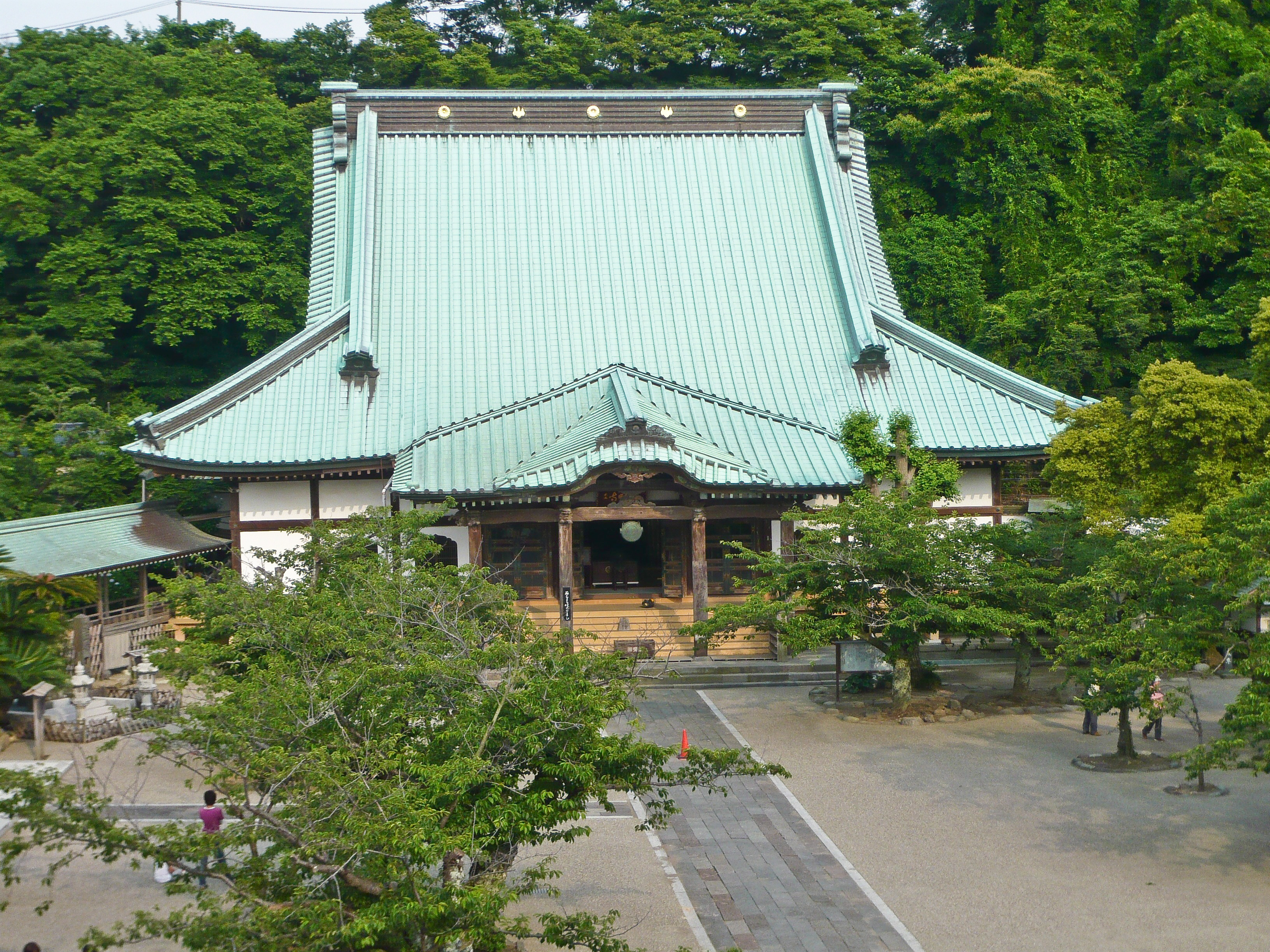
The roof is the dominant feature of a Buddhist temple.

Elements of Buddhist architecture in Japan are not native. The arrival of Buddhism from India via Korea was marked with such constancy that the building styles of all Chinese Six Dynasties are represented. Its history is as a consequence dominated by Chinese and other Asian techniques and styles (present even in Ise Shrine, held to be the quintessence of Japanese architecture) on one side, and by Japanese original variations on those themes on the other.

Partly due also to the variety of climates in Japan and the millennium encompassed between the first cultural import and the last, the result is extremely heterogeneous, but several practically universal features can nonetheless be found. First of all is the choice of materials, always wood in various forms (planks, straw, tree bark, etc.) for almost all structures. Unlike both Western and some Chinese architecture, the use of stone is avoided except for certain specific uses, for example temple podia and pagoda foundations.

The general structure is almost always the same: columns and lintels support a large and gently curved roof, while the walls are paper-thin, often movable and in any case non-carrying. Arches and barrel roofs are completely absent. Gable and eave curves are gentler than in China and columnar entasis (convexity at the center) limited.

The roof is the most visually impressive component, often constituting half the size of the whole edifice. The slightly curved eaves extend far beyond the walls, covering verandas, and their weight must therefore be supported by complex bracket systems called tokyō. These oversize eaves give the interior a characteristic dimness, which contributes to the temple's atmosphere. The interior of the building normally consists of a single room at the center called moya, from which sometimes depart other less important spaces, for example corridors called hisashi.

Inner space divisions are fluid, and room size can be modified through the use of screens or movable paper walls. The large, single space offered by the main hall can therefore be altered according to the need. The separation between inside and outside is itself in some measure not absolute as entire walls can be removed, opening the temple to visitors. Verandas appear to be part of the building to an outsider, but part of the external world to those in the temple. Structures are therefore made to a certain extent part of their environment. The use of construction modules keeps proportions between different parts of the edifice constant, preserving its overall harmony. (Note: On the subject of temple proportions, see also the article ken.)

Even in cases as that of Nikkō Tōshō-gū, where every available space is heavily decorated, ornamentation tends to follow, and therefore emphasize rather than hide, basic structures.

Being shared by both sacred and profane architecture, these architectonic features made it easy converting a lay building into a temple. This happened for example at Hōryū-ji, where a noblewoman's mansion was transformed into a religious building.

== History ==
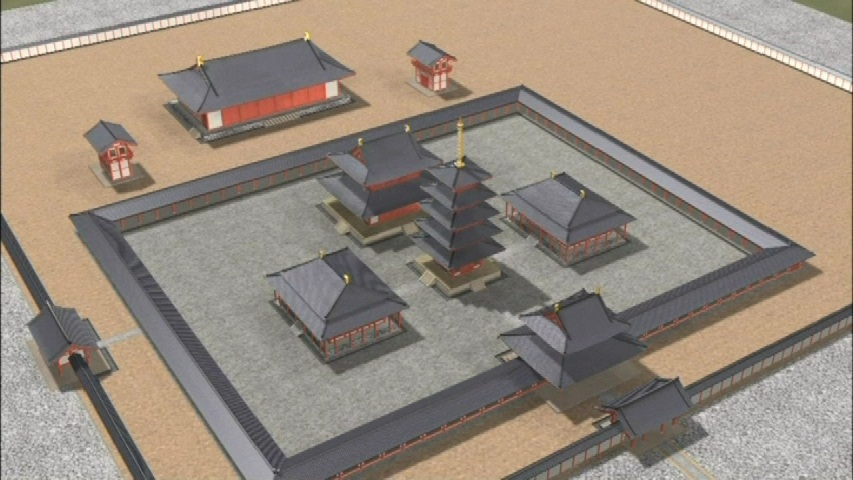
A reconstruction of Asuka-dera's original layout

=== Beginnings – Asuka and Nara periods ===
Buddhism originated in India, and arrived in Japan by first making its way to China and Korea through the Silk Road and then traveling by sea to the Japanese archipelago. Officially adopted in the wake of the Battle of Shigisan in 587, after that date Buddhist temples began to be constructed. Because of the hostility of supporters of local kami beliefs towards Buddhism, no temple of that period survives, so we don't know what they were like. Thanks to the Nihon Shoki, however, we do know that an architect, six Buddhist priests and an image maker from the Korean kingdom of Paekche came to Japan in 577 to advise the Japanese on the arrangement of monastic buildings. The layout of Ōsaka's Shitennō-ji (see below) reflects the plan of Chongyimsa temple in Buyeo, capital of Paekche from 538 to 663. We know for certain that Soga no Umako built Hōkō-ji, the first temple in Japan, between 588 and 596. It was later renamed as Asuka-dera for Asuka, the name of the capital where it was located. Prince Shōtoku actively promoted Buddhism and ordered the construction of Shitennō-ji in Osaka (593) and Hōryū-ji near his palace in Ikaruga (completed in 603). During this period, temple layout was strictly prescribed and followed mainland styles, with a main gate facing south and the most sacred area surrounded by a semi-enclosed roofed corridor (kairō) accessible through a middle gate (chūmon). The sacred precinct contained a pagoda, which acted as a reliquary for sacred objects, and a main hall (kon-dō). The complex might have other structures such as a lecture hall (kō-dō), a belfry (shōrō), a sūtra repository (kyōzō), priests' and monks' quarters and bathhouses. The ideal temple had a heart formed by seven structures called shichidō garan, or "seven hall temple". Buddhism, and the construction of temples, spread from the capital to outlying areas in the Hakuhō period from 645 to 710. In addition, many temples were built in locations favored by the precepts of Chinese geomancy. The arrangements not only of the buildings, groups of trees and ponds of the compound, but also of mountains and other geographic features in particular directions around the temple played important roles as well.

The Chinese five elements school of thought believed that many natural phenomena naturally fell under five categories. Six groups of five categories were established as a rule to the building of edifices.

Five elements	Wood	Fire	Earth	Metal	Water
Position	East	South	Middle	West	North
Weather	Windy	Hot	Humid	Dry	Cold
Colour	Green	Red	Yellow	White	Black
Evolution of living things	Birth	Growth	Change	Weakening	Hiding
Symbolic significance	Prosperity	Riches and honor	Power	Desolation	Death

A palace for a new prince would for example be placed east to symbolize birth, and yellow tiles would be used for the imperial palace to symbolize power.

The five elements theory is also the basis of the gorintō, an extremely common stone stupa whose invention is attributed to Kūkai. Its five sections (a cube, a sphere, a pyramid, a crescent and a lotus-shaped cusp) stand each for one of the five elements.

Chinese numerology also played an important role. According to the Yin-Yang school, which started in about 305 BC, Yang stood for the sun, warmth, maleness and odd numbers, while Yin stood for their opposites. In groups of buildings, therefore, halls occurred in odd numbers because halls themselves were believed to be Yang. Being Yang, odd numbers in general are considered positive and lucky, and Buddhism shows a preference for odd numbers. In the case of storied pagodas, either in stone or wood, the number of stories is almost always odd. Practically all wooden pagodas have either three or five-stories. Specimen with a different number of stories used to exist, but none has survived.

Because of fire, earthquakes, typhoons and wars, few of those ancient temples still exist. Hōryū-ji, rebuilt after a fire in 670, is the only one still possessing 7th-century structures, the oldest extant wooden buildings in the world.

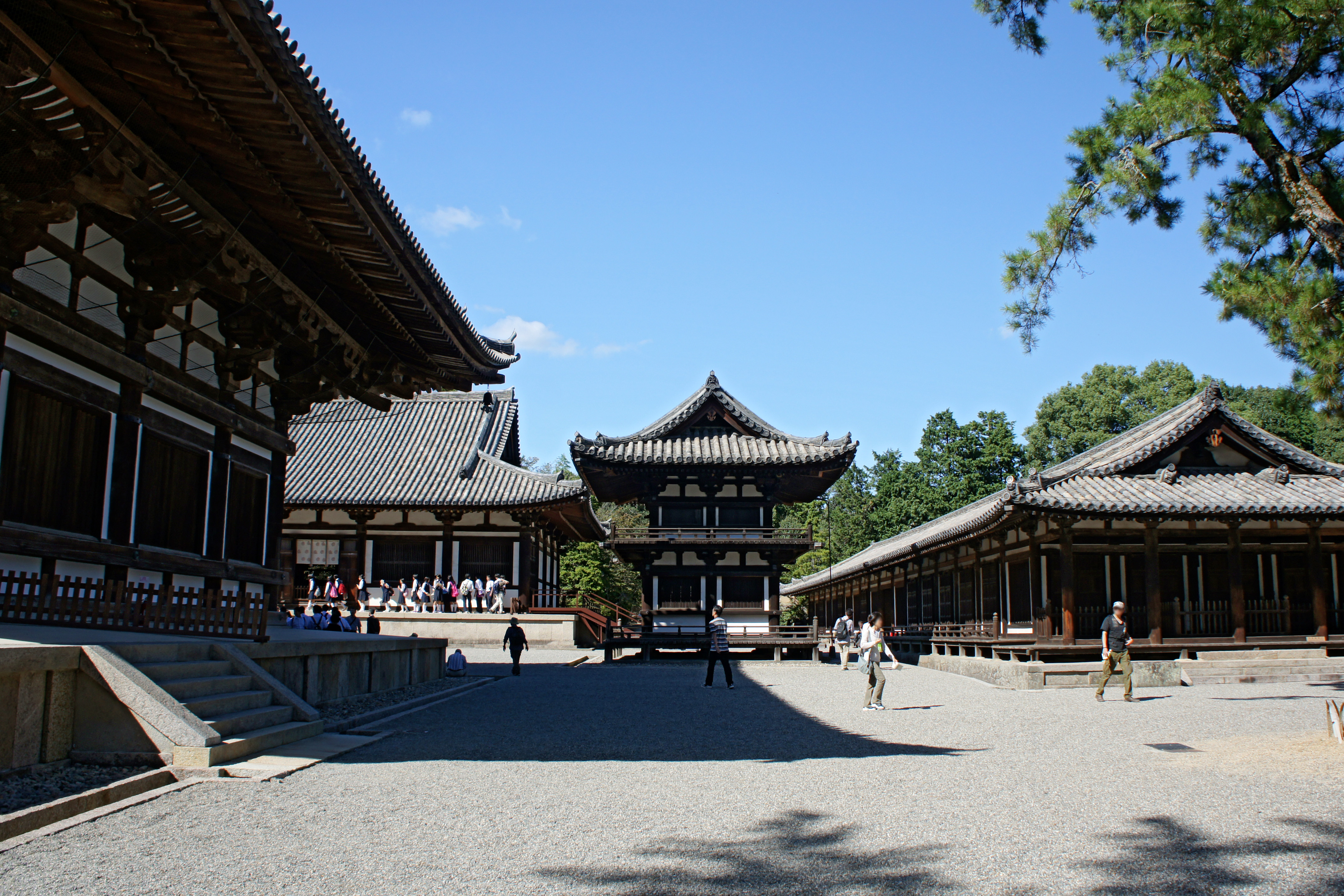
Part of Tōshōdai-ji's garan (left to right, the kon-dō, the kō-dō, and the korō)

Unlike early kami worship shrines, early Buddhist temples were highly ornamental and strictly symmetrical (see reconstruction of Asuka-dera above). Starting with Hōryū-ji in the late 7th century, temples began to move towards irregular ground plans that resulted in an asymmetric arrangement of buildings, greater use of natural materials such as cypress bark instead of roof tiling, and an increased awareness of natural environment with the placement of buildings among trees. This adaptation was assisted by the syncretism of kami and Buddhism, which through Japanese traditional nature worship gave Buddhism a greater attention to natural surroundings. During the first half of the 8th century, Emperor Shōmu decreed temples and nunneries be erected in each province and that Tōdai-ji be built as a headquarters for the network of temples. The head temple was inaugurated in 752 and was of monumental dimensions with two seven-storied pagodas, each ca. 100 m (330 ft) tall and a Great Buddha Hall (daibutsuden) about 80 m × 70 m (260 ft × 230 ft). Nara period Buddhism was characterised by seven influential state supported temples, the so-called Nanto Shichi Daiji. Octagonal structures such as the Hall of Dreams at Hōryū-ji built as memorial halls and storehouses exemplified by the Shōsōin first appeared during the Nara period. Temple structures, such as pagodas and main halls, had increased significantly in size since the late 6th century. The placement of the pagoda moved to a more peripheral location and the roof bracketing system increased in complexity as roofs grew larger and heavier.

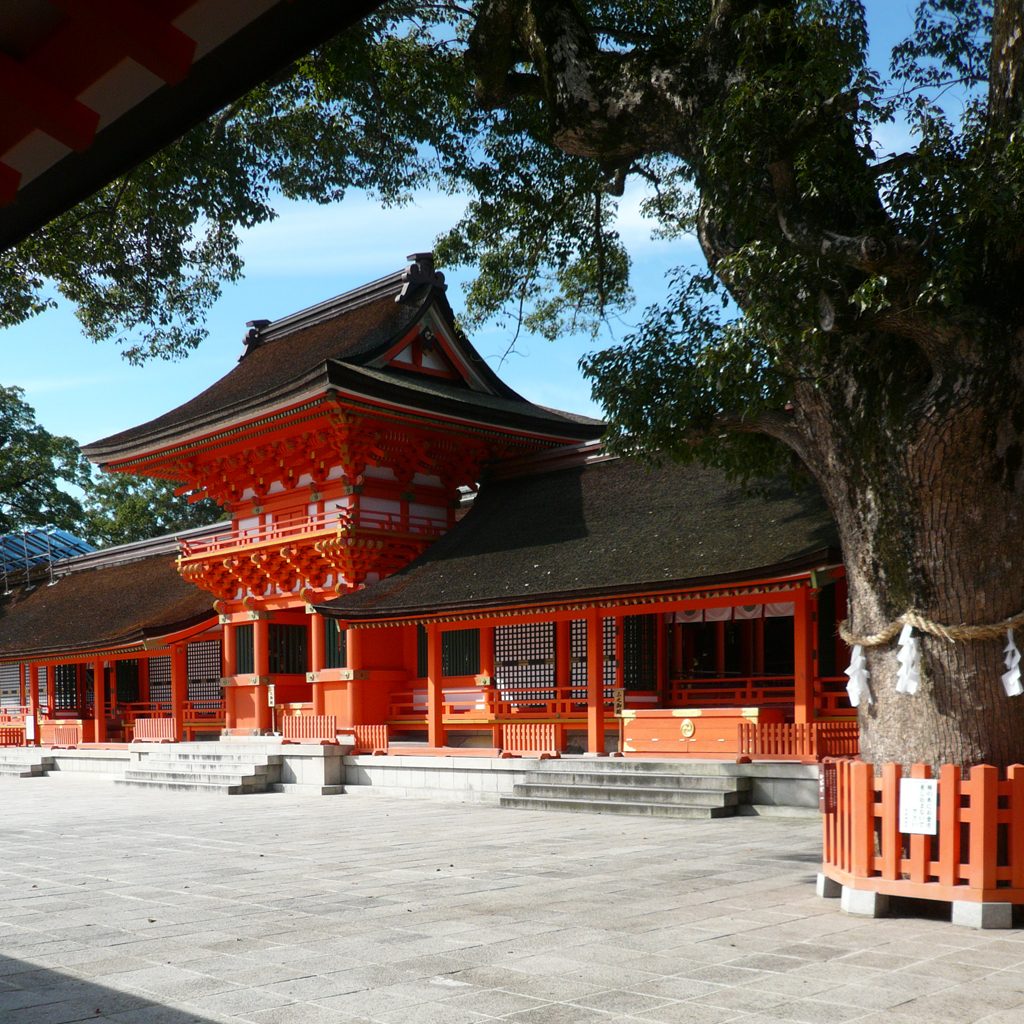
Usa Hachiman-gū is now a Shinto shrine, but used to be also a temple

Another early effort to reconcile kami worship and Buddhism was made in the 8th century during the Nara period with the founding of the so-called jungūji (神宮寺), or "shrine-temples". The use in a Shinto shrine of Buddhist religious objects was believed to be necessary since the kami were lost beings in need of liberation through the power of Buddha. Kami were thought to be subject to karma and reincarnation like human beings, and early Buddhist stories tell how the task of helping suffering kami was assumed by wandering monks. A local kami would appear in a dream to the monk, telling him about his suffering. To improve the kami's karma through rites and the reading of sutras, the monk would build a temple next to the kami's shrine. Such groupings were created already in the 7th century, for example in Usa, Kyūshū, where kami Hachiman was worshiped together with Miroku Bosatsu (Maitreya) at Usa Hachiman-gū.

At the end of the same century, in what is considered the second stage of the amalgamation, the kami Hachiman was declared to be protector-deity of the Dharma and a little bit later a bodhisattva. Shrines for him started to be built at temples, marking an important step ahead in the process of amalgamation of kami and Buddhist cults. When the great Buddha at Tōdai-ji in Nara was built, within the temple grounds was also erected a shrine for Hachiman, according to the legend because of a wish expressed by the kami himself. This coexistence of Buddhism and kami worship, in religion as well as architecture, continued until the Kami and Buddhas Separation Order (神仏判然令, shinbutsu hanzen-rei; lit. kami Buddha separation order) of 1868.

=== Heian period ===
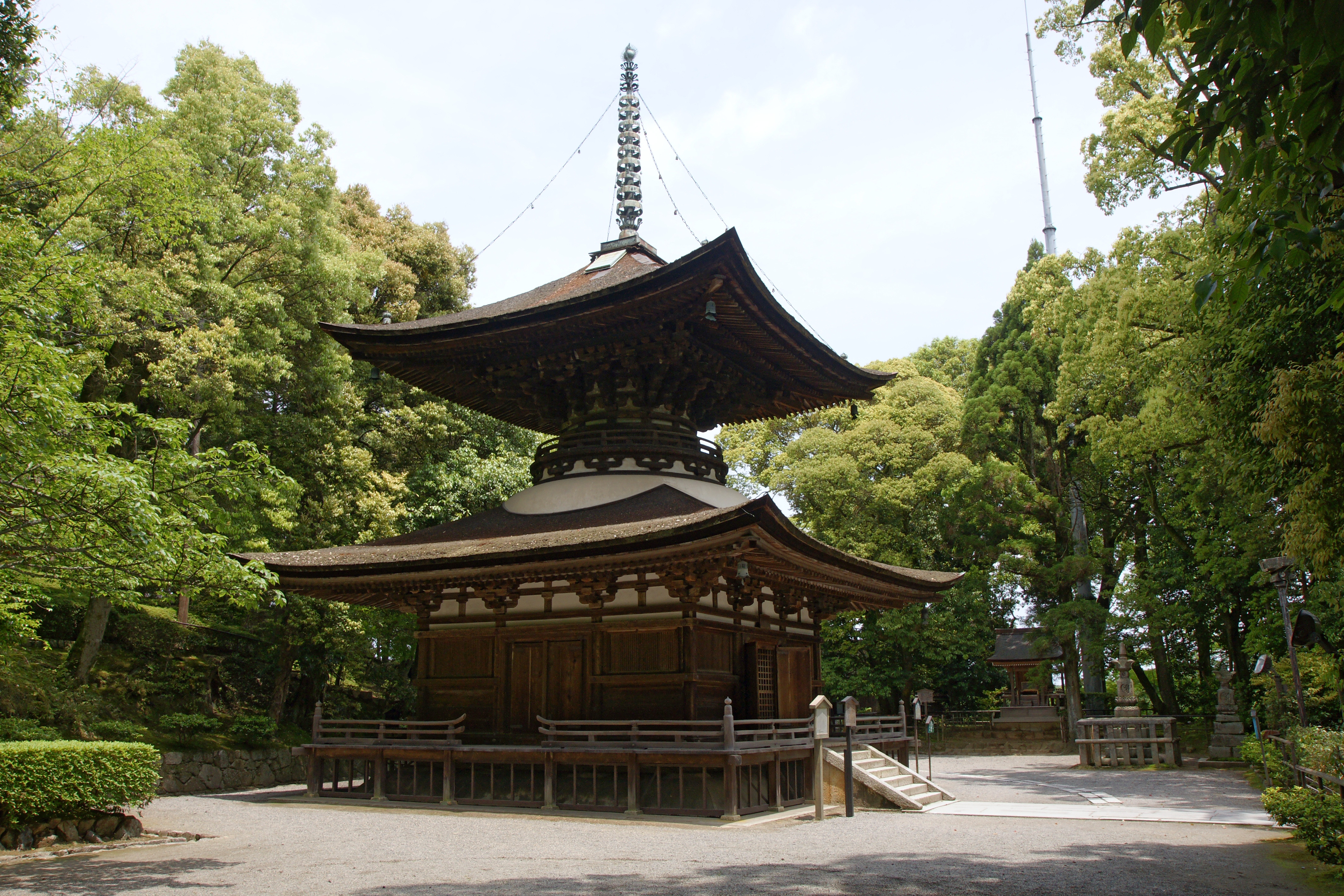
The tahōtō is an invention of the Heian period (Ishiyama-dera)

During the Heian period Buddhism became even more infused with Japanese elements: It met and assimilated local beliefs concerning ghosts and spirits (the so-called onrei and mitama), developing traits close to magic and sorcery which allowed it to penetrate a wide spectrum of social classes. Its merging with indigenous religious belief was then accelerated by the systematization of the syncretism of Buddhism and local religious beliefs (see the article on the honji suijaku theory, which claimed that Japanese kami were simply Buddhist gods under a different name). It was in this kind of environment that Fujiwara no Michinaga and retired Emperor Shirakawa competed in erecting new temples, in the process giving birth to the Jōdo-kyō (Note: Jōdokyō, or Pure Land Buddhism, was a form of Buddhism which strongly influenced the Shingon and Tendai sects, later becoming an independent sect.) architecture and the new wayō architectural style.

The early Heian period (9th–10th century) saw an evolution of styles based on the esoteric sects Tendai and Shingon. These two sects followed faithfully the Nanto Rokushū architectonic tradition in the plains, but in mountainous areas developed an original style. This development was facilitated by the syncretic fusion of foreign Buddhism with local mountain worship cults. Called wayō (和様, Japanese style) to distinguish it from imported Chinese styles, it was characterized by simplicity, refrain from ornamentation, use of natural timber and in general plain materials. Structurally, it was distinguished by: a main hall divided in two parts; an outer area for novices and an inner area for initiates; a hip-and-gable roof covering both areas; a raised wooden floor instead of the tile or stone floors of earlier temples; extended eaves to cover the front steps; shingles or bark rather than tile roofing; and a disposition of the garan adapting to the natural environment, and not following the traditional symmetrical layouts. The tahōtō, a two-storied tower with some resemblance to Indian stupas, was also introduced by these sects during this period. According to an ancient Buddhist prophecy, the world would enter a dark period called Mappō in 1051. During this period the Tendai sect believed that enlightenment was possible only through the veneration of Amida Buddha. Consequently, many so-called Paradise (or Amida) Halls—such as the Phoenix Hall at Byōdō-in (1053), the Main Hall of Jōruri-ji (1157) and the Golden Hall at Chūson-ji (1124)—were built by the Imperial Family or members of the aristocracy to recreate the western paradise of Amida on earth. Amida Halls that enshrined the nine statues of Amida (Note: The statues represented the nine stages of Nirvana.) were popular during the 12th century (late Heian period). The Main Hall of Jōruri-ji is however the only example of such a hall still extant.

=== Kamakura and Muromachi periods ===
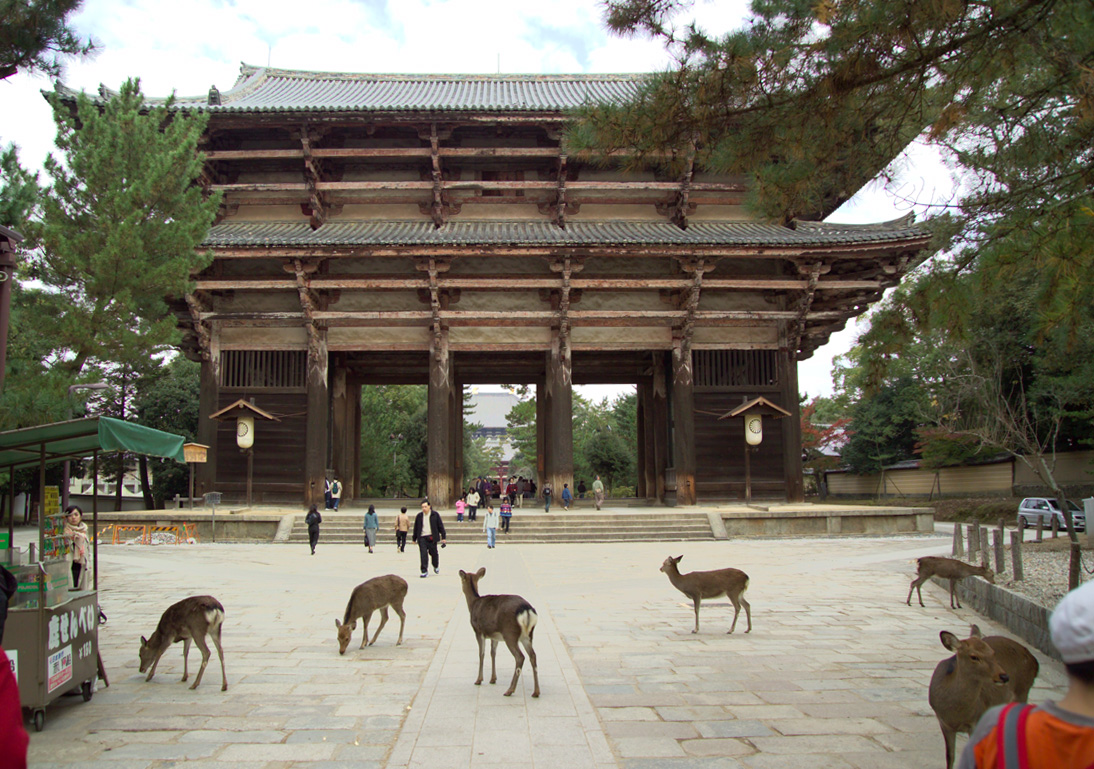
Daibutsu style (Tōdai-ji's Nandaimon)

The Kamakura period (1185–1333) brought to power the warrior caste, which expressed in its religious architecture its necessities and tastes. The influential Zen arrived in Japan from China, and the Jōdō sect achieved independence. In architecture this period is characterized by the birth of fresh and rational designs.

The Daibutsu style (ja:大仏様, daibutsuyō; lit. great Buddha style) and the Zen style (ja:禅宗様, zen'yō; lit. Zen sect style) emerged in the late 12th or early 13th century.

The first, introduced by the priest Chōgen, was based on Song dynasty architecture and represented the antithesis of the simple and traditional wayō style. The Nandaimon at Tōdai-ji and the Amida Hall at Jōdo-ji are the only extant examples of this style. Originally called tenjikuyō (天竺様, lit. Indian style), because it had nothing to do with India it was rechristened by scholar Ōta Hirotarō during the 20th century, and the new term stuck. Ōta derived the name from Chōgen's work, particularly Tōdai-ji's Daibutsuden.

The Zen style was originally called karayō (唐様, Chinese style) and, like the Daibutsu style, was rechristened by Ōta. Its characteristics are earthen floors, subtly curved pent roofs (mokoshi) and pronouncedly curved main roofs, cusped windows (katōmado) and paneled doors. Examples of this style include the belfry at Tōdai-ji, the Founder's Hall at Eihō-ji and the Shariden at Engaku-ji. The Zen garan usually does not have a pagoda and, when it does, it is relegated to a peripheral position.

These three styles we have seen (wayō, daibutsuyō and zen'yō) were often combined during the Muromachi period (1336–1573), giving birth to the so-called Eclectic Style (折衷様, setchūyō), exemplified by the main hall at Kakurin-ji. The combination of wayō and daibutsuyō in particular became so frequent that sometimes it is called by scholars Shin-wayō (新和様, new wayō). By the end of the Muromachi period (late 16th century), Japanese Buddhist architecture had reached its apogee. Construction methods had been perfected and building types conventionalized.

=== Azuchi-Momoyama and Edo periods ===
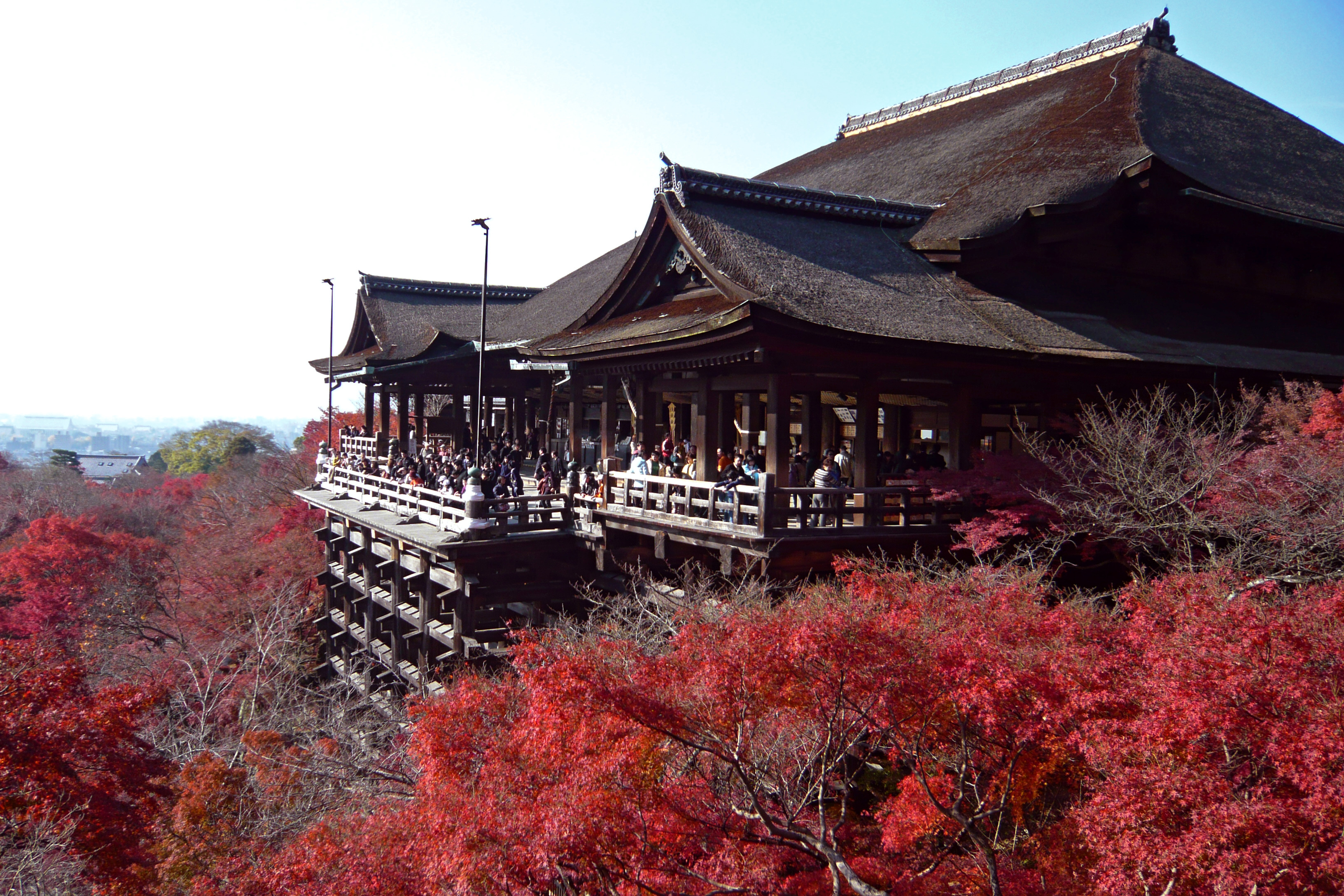
The main hall of Kiyomizu-dera, Kyoto

After the turbulence of the Sengoku period and the establishment of the Tokugawa shogunate in 1603, old temples like Hieizan, Tō-ji and Tōdai-ji lost their power and the schools of Buddhism were surpassed in influence by the Nichiren-shū and Jōdo-shū. The Edo period was an era of unprecedented building fervor in religious architecture. The number of faithful coming for prayer or pilgrimage had increased, so designs changed to take into account their necessities, and efforts were made to catch their ears and eyes. Old sects limited themselves to revive old styles and ideas, while the new relied on huge spaces and complex designs. Both, in spite of their differences, have in common a reliance on splendor and excess. Early pre-modern temples were saved from monotony by elaborate structural details, the use of undulating karahafu gables and the use of buildings of monumental size. While structural design tended to become gradually more rational and efficient, the surface of religious edifices did the opposite, growing more elaborate and complex. After the middle Edo period, passed its zenith, religious architecture ended up just repeating told ideas, losing its innovative spirit and entering its final decline. Representative examples for the Momoyama (1568–1603) and Edo period (1603–1868) temple architecture are the Karamon at Hōgon-ji and the main hall of Kiyomizu-dera, respectively.

=== Meiji period ===
In 1868 the government enacted its policy of separation of Buddhas and kami called Shinbutsu bunri, with catastrophic consequences for the architecture of both temples and shrines. Until that time, the syncretism of kami and buddhas had posed little problem, and brought a measure of harmony between the adherents of the two religions, and under the syncretic system, many customs evolved that are still in practice and are best understood under the syncretic context. Because many structures became illegal where they stood, such as Buddhist pagodas within the precincts of Shinto shrines, they had to be destroyed, according to the letter of the law. An estimated 30,000 Buddhist structures were demolished between 1868 and 1874. Buddhism eventually made a recovery in many parts of the country, yet in others, most notably in Kagoshima prefecture, there is still a near absence of Buddhist structures.

== Common temple features ==
- Butsuden or Butsu-dō (仏殿・仏堂) – lit. "Hall of Buddha".
  - A Zen temple's main hall. Seems to have two stories, but has in fact only one and measures either 3x3 or 5x5 bays.
  - Any building enshrining the statue of Buddha or of a bodhisattva and dedicated to prayer.
- chinjusha (鎮守社/鎮主社) – a small shrine built at a Buddhist temple and dedicated to its tutelary kami.
- chōzuya (手水舎) – see temizuya.
- chūmon (中門) – in a temple, the gate after the naindaimon connected to a kairō. See also mon.
- dō (堂) – Lit. hall. Suffix for the name of the buildings part of a temple. The prefix can be the name of a deity associated with it (e.g. Yakushi-dō, or Yakushi hall) or express the building's function within the temple's compound (e.g. hon-dō, or main hall). See also Butsu-dō, hō-dō, hon-dō, jiki-dō, kaisan-dō, kō-dō, kon-dō, kyō-dō, mandara-dō, miei-dō, mi-dō, sō-dō, Yakushi-dō and zen-dō.
- garan – see shichi-dō garan.
- hattō (法堂) – lit. "Dharma hall". A building dedicated to lectures by the chief priest on Buddhism's scriptures (the hō).
- hōjō (方丈) – the living quarters of the head priest of a Zen temple.
- Hokke-dō (法華堂) – lit. "Lotus Sūtra hall". In Tendai Buddhism, a hall whose layout allows walking around a statue for meditation. The purpose of walking is to concentrate on the Hokekyō and seek the ultimate truth.
- jiki-dō (食堂) – dining hall in ancient temples. See also sai-dō.
- honbō (本坊) – residence of the jushoku, or head priest, of a temple.
- kairō (回廊・廻廊) – a long and roofed portico-like passage connecting two buildings.
- kaisan-dō (開山堂) – founder's hall, usually at a Zen temple. Building enshrining a statue, portrait or memorial tablet of the founder of either the temple or the sect it belongs to. Jōdo sect temples often call it miei-dō.
- karamon (唐門) – generic term for a gate with an arched roof. See also mon.
- karesansui (枯山水) – lit. dry landscape. A Japanese rock garden, often present in Zen temples, and sometimes found in temples of other sects too.
- katōmado (華頭窓) – a bell shaped window originally developed at Zen temples in China, but widely used by other Buddhist sects as well as in lay buildings.
- kon-dō (金堂) – lit. "golden hall", it is the main hall of a garan, housing the main object of worship. Unlike a butsuden, it is a true two-story building (although the second story may sometimes be missing) measuring 9x7 bays.
- konrō (軒廊) – covered corridor between two buildings
- korō or kurō (鼓楼) – tower housing a drum that marks the passing of time. It used to face the shōrō and lie next to the kō-dō, but now the drum is usually kept in the rōmon.
- kuin* (庫院) – kitchen/office of a Zen garan. A building hosting the galleys, the kitchen, and the offices of a temple. Usually situated in front and to the side of the butsuden, facing the sō-dō. Also called kuri.
- kuri (庫裏) – see kuin
- kyō-dō (経堂) – see kyōzō.
- kyōzō (経蔵) – lit. "scriptures deposit". Repository of sūtras and books about the temple's history. Also called kyō–dō.
- miei-dō (御影堂) – lit. "image hall". Building housing an image of the temple's founder, equivalent to a Zen sect's kaisan-dō.
- mi-dō (御堂) – a generic honorific term for a building which enshrines a sacred statue.
- Miroku Nyorai (弥勒如来) – Japanese name of Maitreya.
- mon (門) – a temple's gate, which can be named after its position (nandaimon: lit. "great southern gate"), its structure (nijūmon: "two storied gate"), a deity (Niōmon: lit. "Nio gate"), or its use (onarimon: lit. "imperial visit gate", a gate reserved to the Emperor). The same gate can therefore be described using more than one term. For example, a Niōmon can at the same time be a nijūmon.
- nandaimon (南大門) – the main southern gate of a temple, in particular that at Nara's Tōdai-ji. See also mon.
- nijūmon (二重門) – a two-storied gate with a roof surrounding the first floor. See also mon.
- Niōmon (仁王門 or 二王門) – a two-storied or high gate guarded by two wooden guardians called Niō. See also mon.
- noborirō (登廊) – a covered stairway at Nara's Hasedera.
- pagoda – see stupa and tō.
- sai-dō (斎堂) – the refectory at a Zen temple or monastery. See also jiki-dō.
- sandō (参道) – the approach leading from a torii to a shrine. The term is also used sometimes at Buddhist temples too.
- sanmon (三門 or 山門) – the gate in front of the butsuden. The name is short for Sangedatsumon (三解脱門), lit. Gate of the three liberations. Its three openings (kūmon (空門), musōmon (無相門) and muganmon (無願門)) symbolize the three gates to enlightenment. Entering, one can free himself from three passions (貪 ton, or greed, 瞋 shin, or hatred, and 癡 chi, or "foolishness"). See also mon. Its size depends on the temple's rank. (See photos.)
- sanrō (山廊) – small buildings at the ends of a two-storied Zen gate containing the stairs to the second story.
- sekitō (石塔) – a stone pagoda (stupa). See also tō
- shichidō garan (七堂伽藍) – a double compound term literally meaning "seven halls" (七堂) and "(temple) buildings" (伽藍). What is counted in the group of seven buildings, or shichidō, can vary greatly from temple to temple and from school to school. In practice, shichidō garan can also mean simply a large complex.
  - Nanto Rokushū and later non-Zen schools: The shichidō garan in this case includes a kon-dō, a tō, a kō-dō, a shōrō, a jiki-dō, a sōbō, and a kyōzō.
  - Zen schools: A Zen shichidō garan includes a butsuden or butsu-dō, a hattō, a ku'in, a sō-dō, a sanmon, a tōsu and a yokushitsu.
- shariden (舎利殿) – reliquary containing relics associated with Buddha
- shoin (書院) – originally a study and a place for lectures on the sutra within a temple, later the term came to mean just a study.
- shōrō (鐘楼) – a temple's belfry, a building from which a bell is hung.
- sōbō (僧坊) – The monks' living quarters in a non-Zen garan
- sō-dō (僧堂) – Lit. "monk hall". A building dedicated to the practice of Zazen. It used to be dedicated to many kinds of activities, from eating to sleeping, centered on zazen.
- sōmon (総門) – the gate at the entrance of a temple. It precedes the bigger and more important sanmon. See also mon.
- sōrin (相輪) – a spire reaching up from the center of the roof of some temple halls, tiered like a pagoda.
- sotoba or sotōba (卒塔婆) – transliteration of the Sanskrit stupa.
  - A pagoda. Tower with an odd number of tiers (three, five, seven nine, or thirteen). See also stupa and tō.
  - Strips of wood left behind tombs during annual ceremonies (tsuizen) symbolizing a stupa. The upper part is segmented like a pagoda and carries Sanskrit inscriptions, sutras, and the kaimyō (posthumous name) of the deceased. In present-day Japanese, sotoba usually has this meaning.
- stupa – in origin a vessel for Buddha's relics, later also a receptacle for scriptures and other relics. Its shape changed in the Far East under the influence of the Chinese watchtower to form tower-like structures like the Tōbuttō, the gorintō, the hōkyōintō, the sekitō, the tō, or the much simpler wooden stick-style sotoba.
- tatchū (塔頭 or 塔中)
  - In Zen temples, a building containing a pagoda enshrining the ashes of an important priest stands.
  - Later, it became a subsidiary temple or a minor temple depending from a larger one.
  - Finally, it became also subsidiary temple being the family temple (bodaiji) of an important family.
- tahōtō (多宝塔) – a two-storied pagoda with a ground floor having a dome-shaped ceiling and a square pent roof, a round second floor and square roofs.
- temizuya (手水舎) – a fountain near the entrance of a shrine and a temple where worshipers can cleanse their hands and mouths before worship.
- tesaki (手先) – Term used to count the roof-supporting brackets (tokyō (斗きょう)) projecting from a temple's wall, usually composed of two steps (futatesaki (二手先）)) or three (mitesaki 三津手先).
- tokyō (斗きょう) – see tesaki.
- torii (鳥居) – the iconic Shinto gate at the entrance of a sacred area, usually, but not always, a shrine. Shrines of various size can be found next to, or inside Buddhist temples. Occasionally, torii can also mark the main entrance to a Buddhist temple, such as Hōzan-ji, although this is uncommon.
- tōrō (灯籠) – a lantern at a shrine or Buddhist temple. Some of its forms are influenced by the gorintō.
- tō (塔)
  - A pagoda, and an evolution of the stupa. After reaching China, the stupa evolved into a tower with an odd number of tiers (three, five, seven, nine, thirteen), excepted the tahōtō, which has two.
  - The word is used together as a suffix of a numeral indicating the number of a pagoda's tiers (three tiers= san-jū-no-tō, five tiers= go-jū-no-tō, seven tiers = nana-jū-no-tō, etc.).
- tōsu or tōshi (東司) – a Zen monastery's toilet.
- Yakushi-dō (薬師堂) – a building that enshrines a statue of Yakushi Nyorai.*
- yokushitsu* (浴室) – a monastery's bathroom.
- zen-dō (禅堂) – lit. "hall of Zen". The building where monks practice zazen, and one of the main structures of a Zen garan.

== Gallery ==
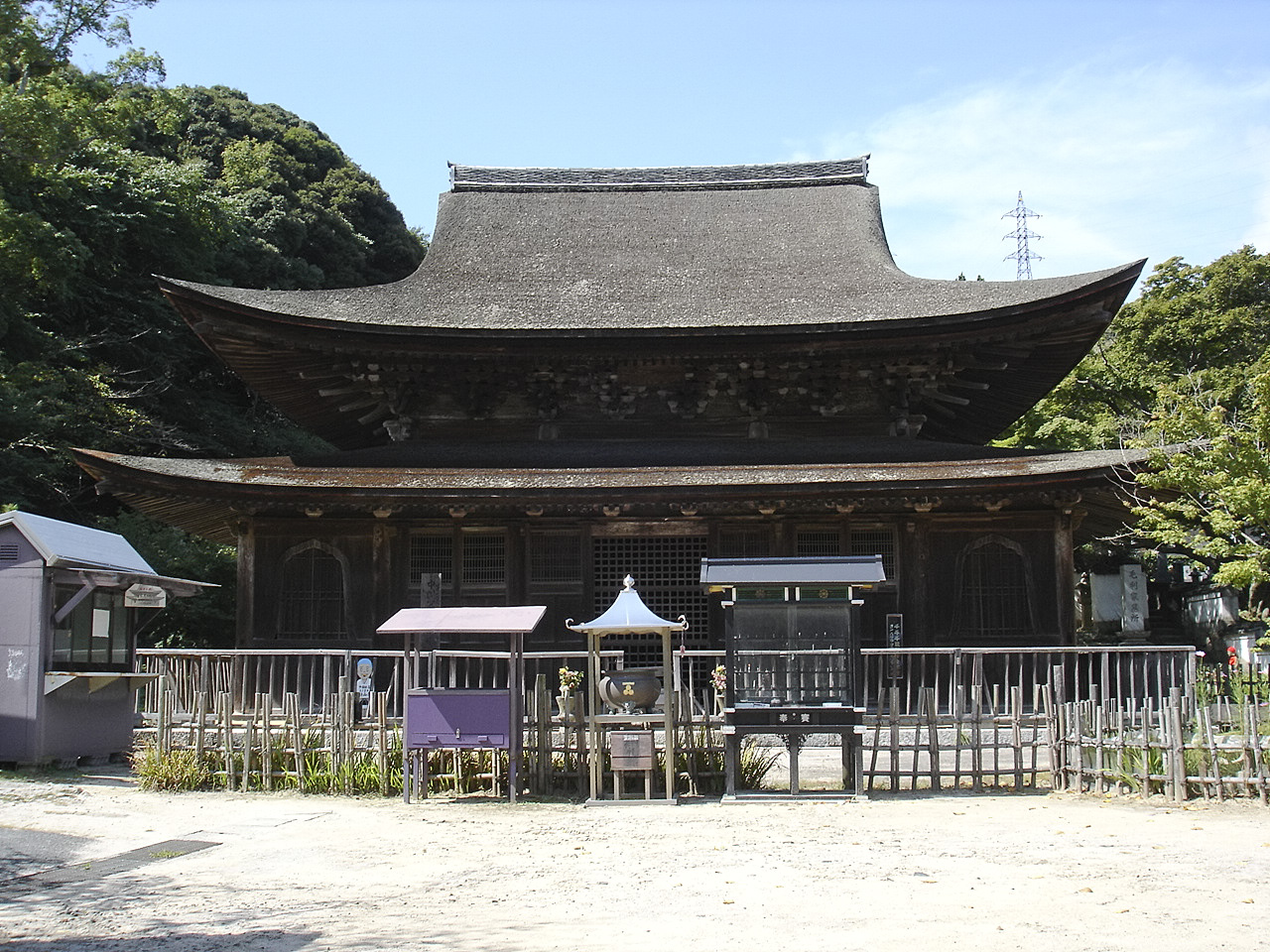
Kōzan-ji in Shimonoseki's Butsuden

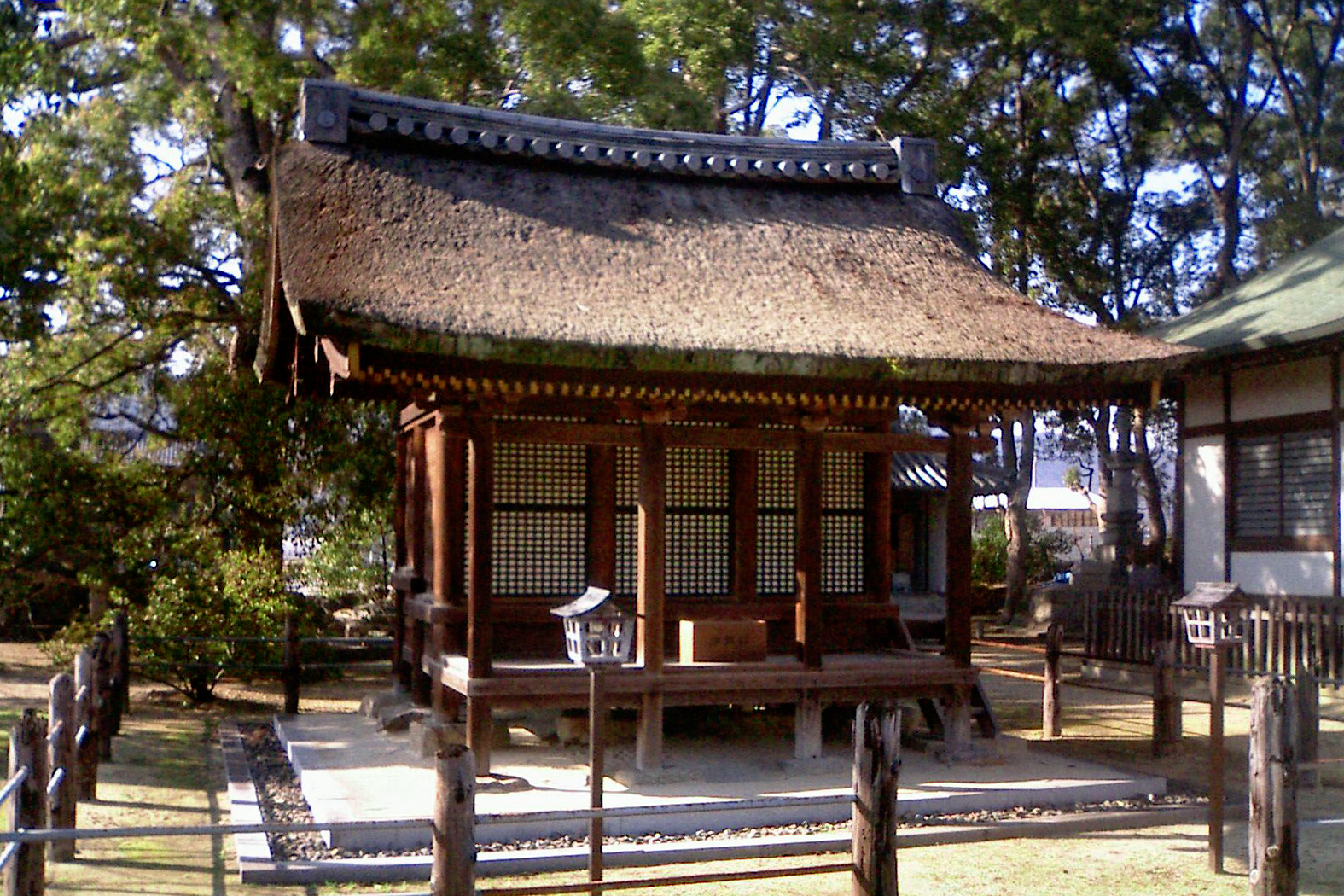
Motoyama-ji's chinjū-dō

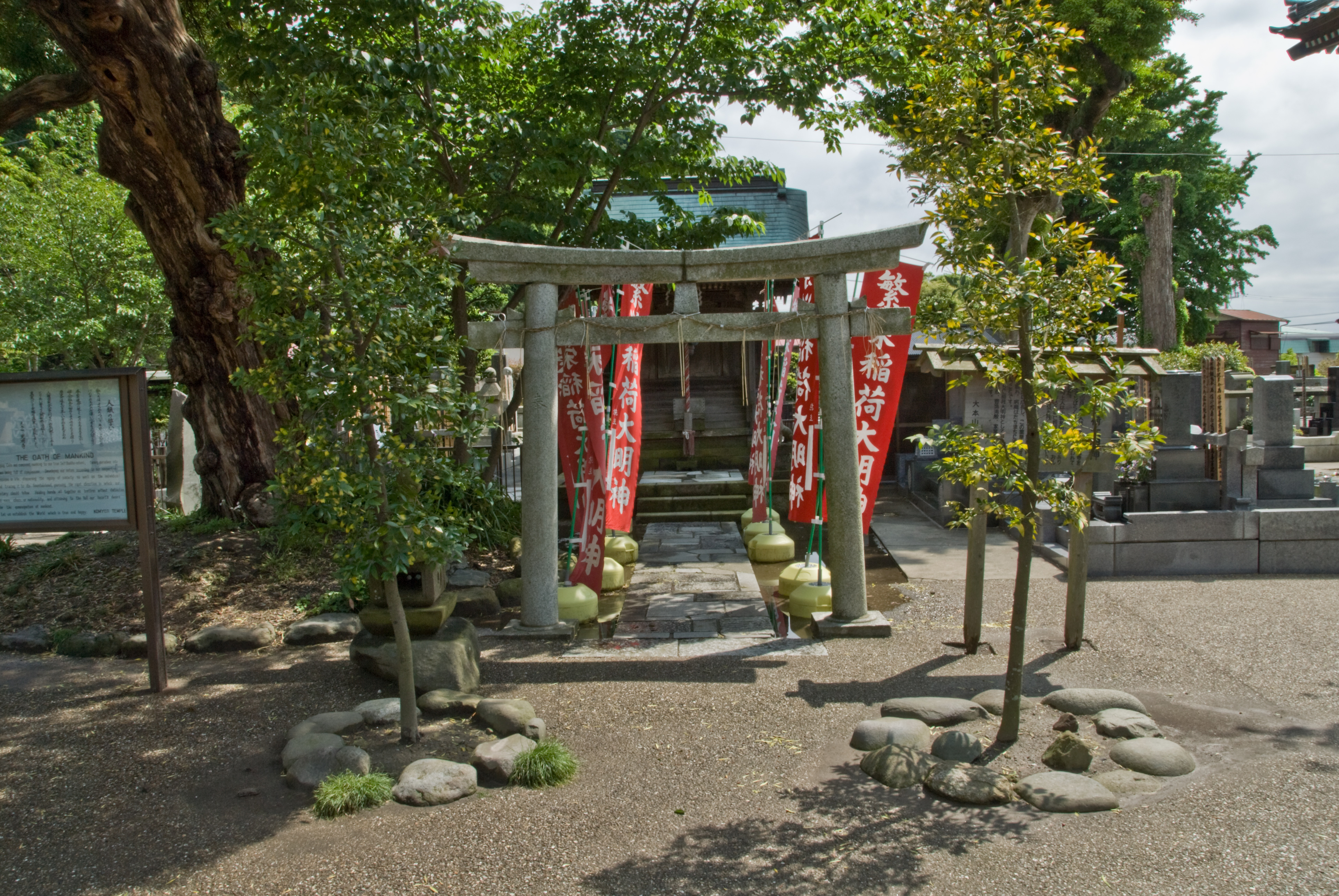
Kōmyō-ji's chinjusha

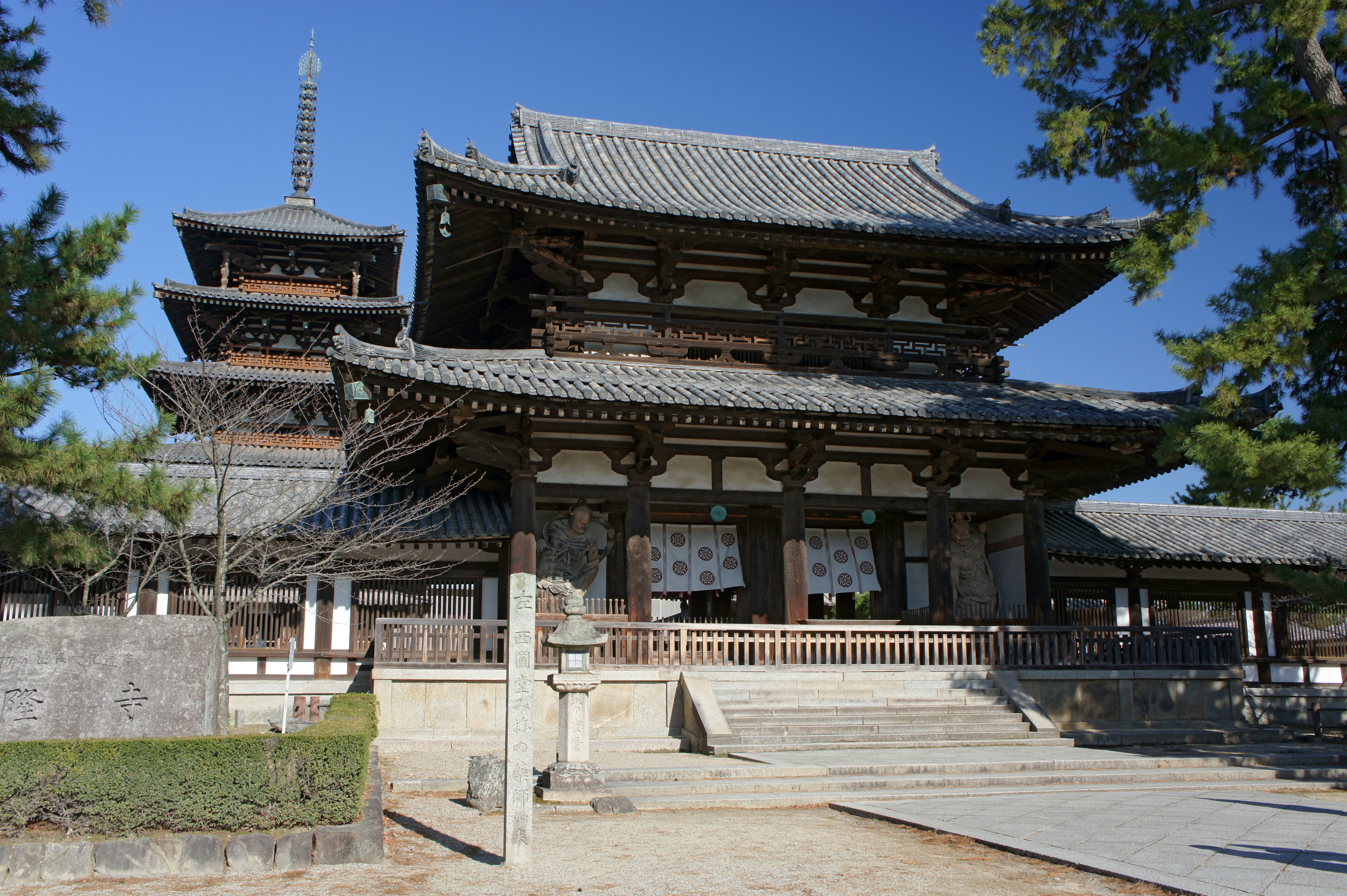
Chūmon at Hōryū-ji

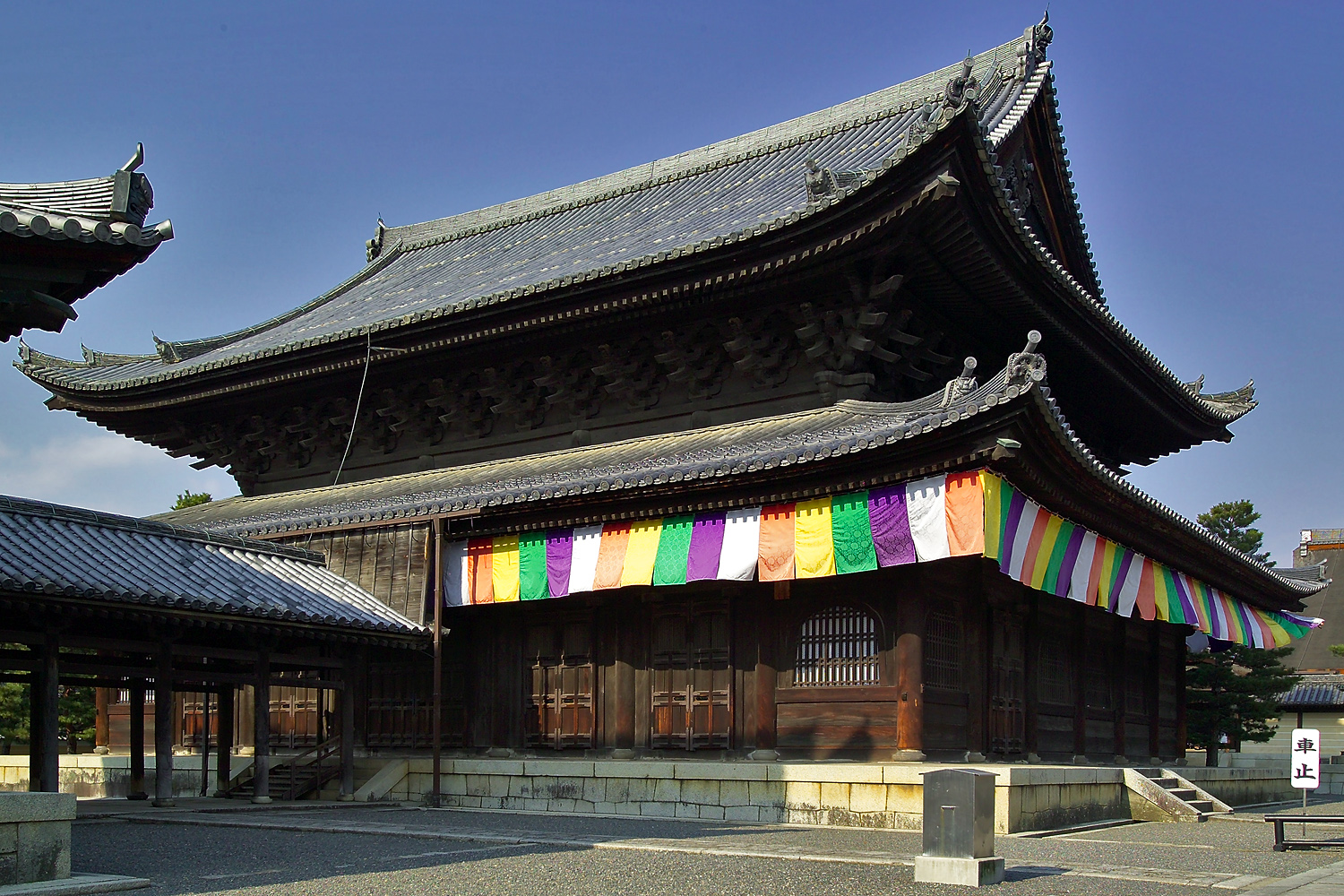
Myōshin-ji's hattō

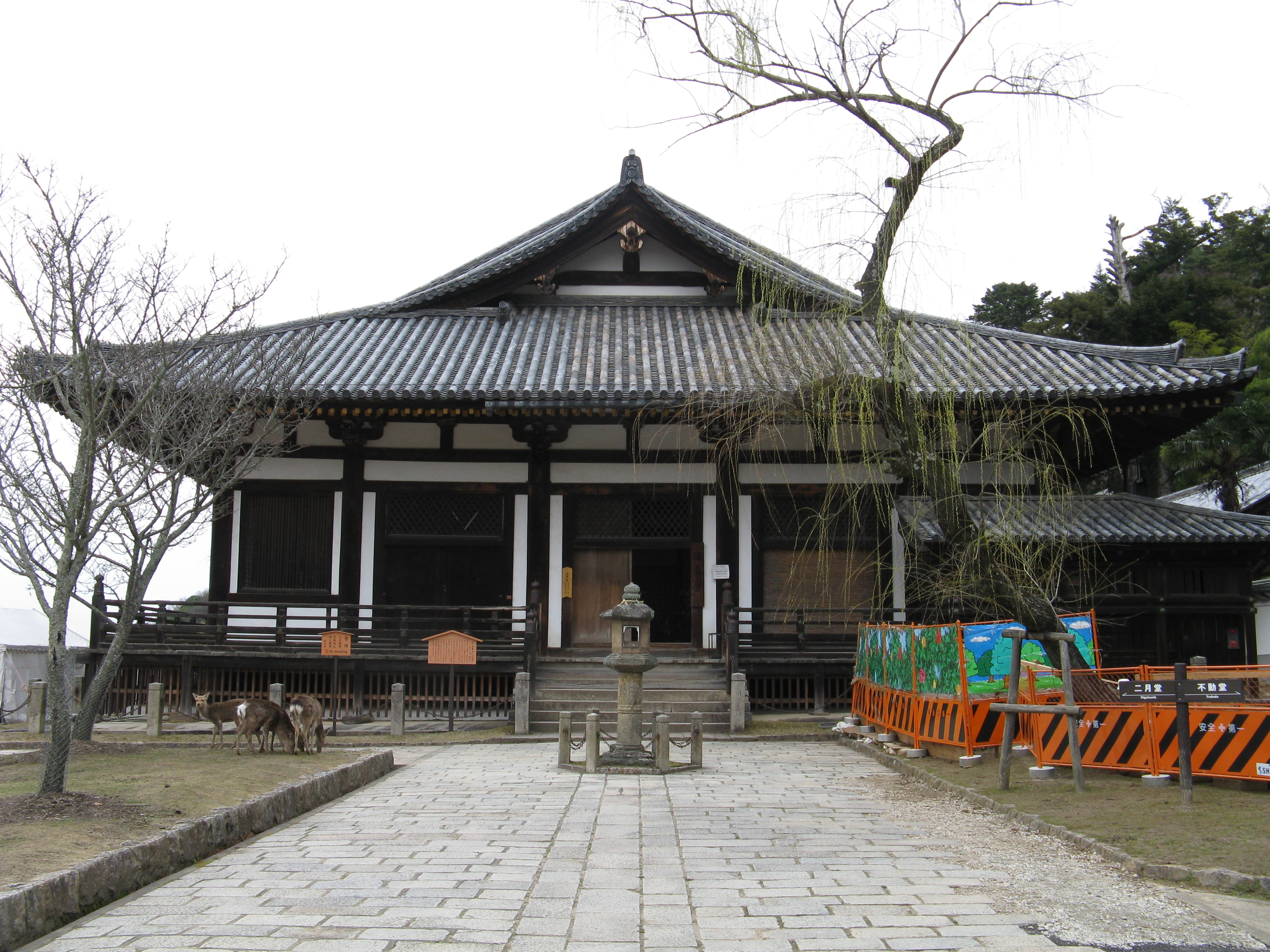
Tōdai-ji's Hokke-dō

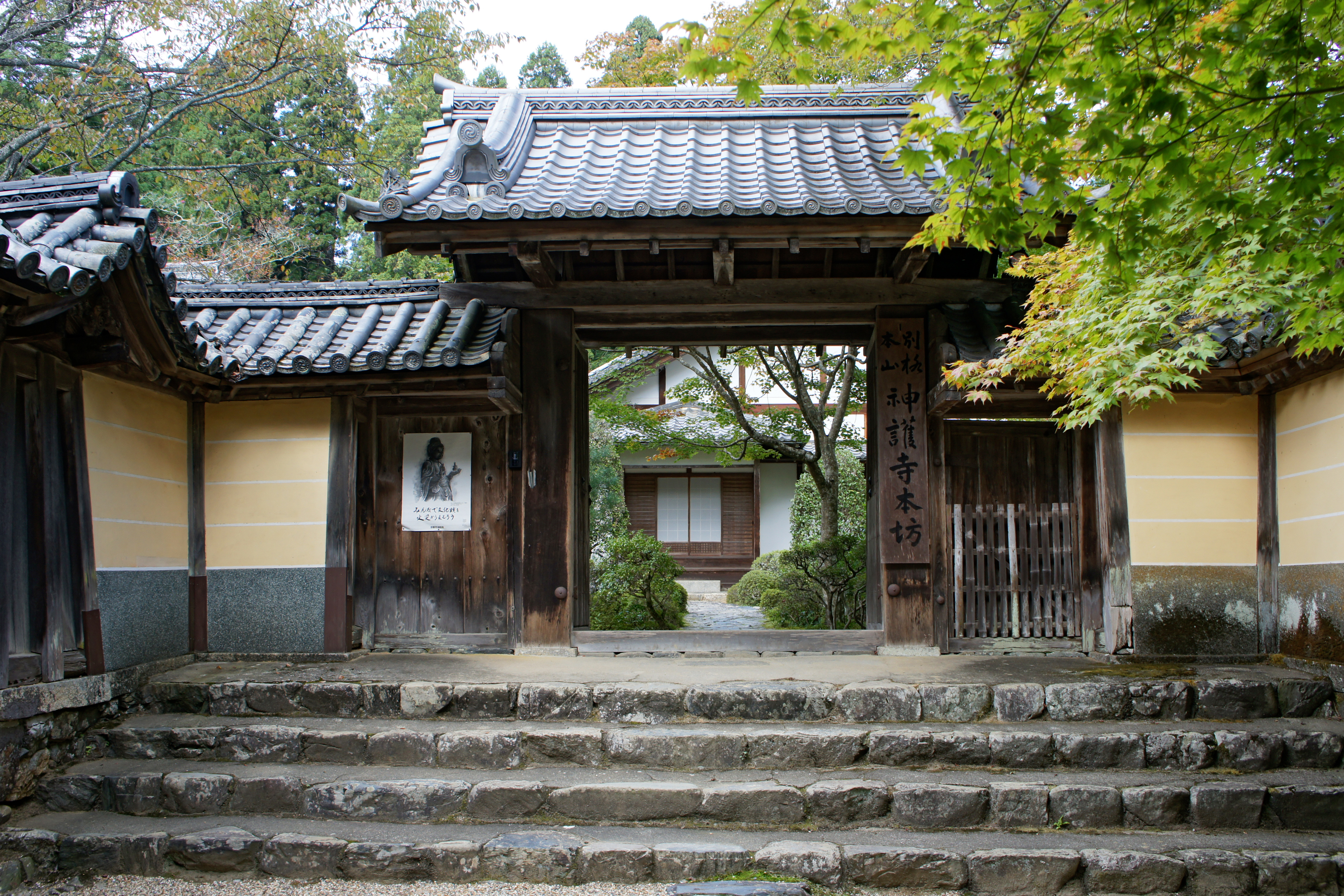
Jingo-ji's honbō

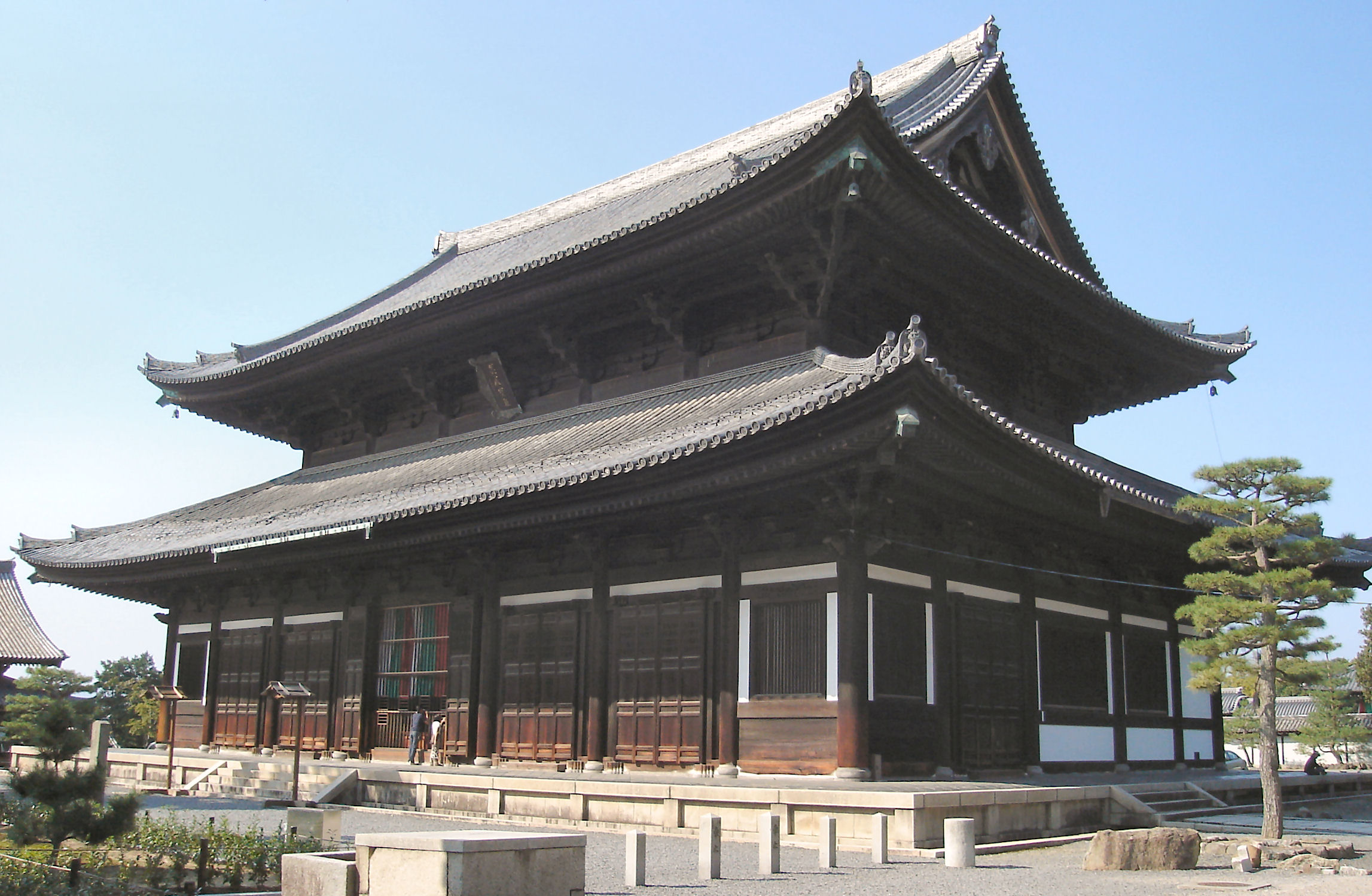
Tofuku-ji's hon-dō

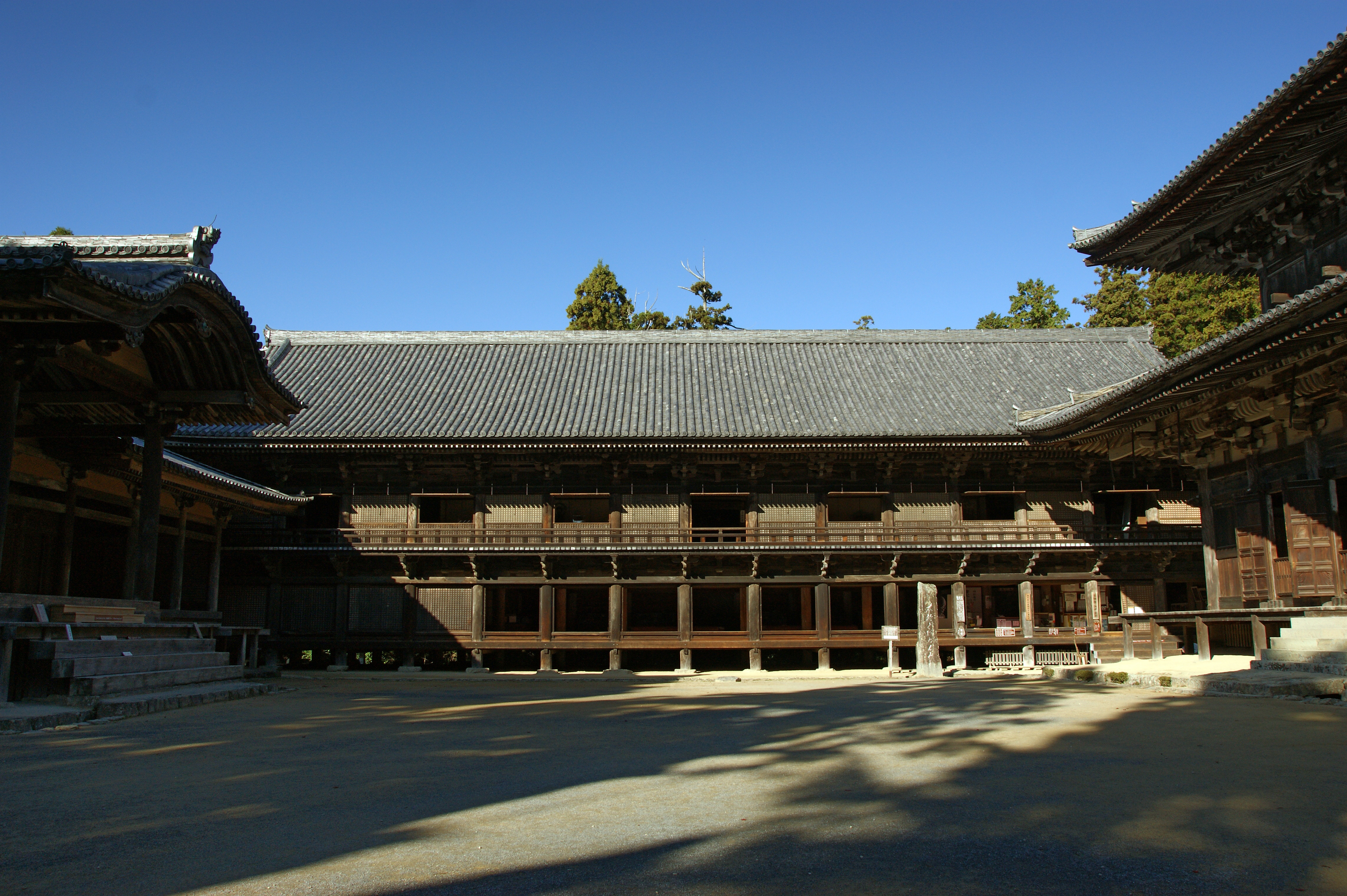
Engyō-ji's jiki-dō

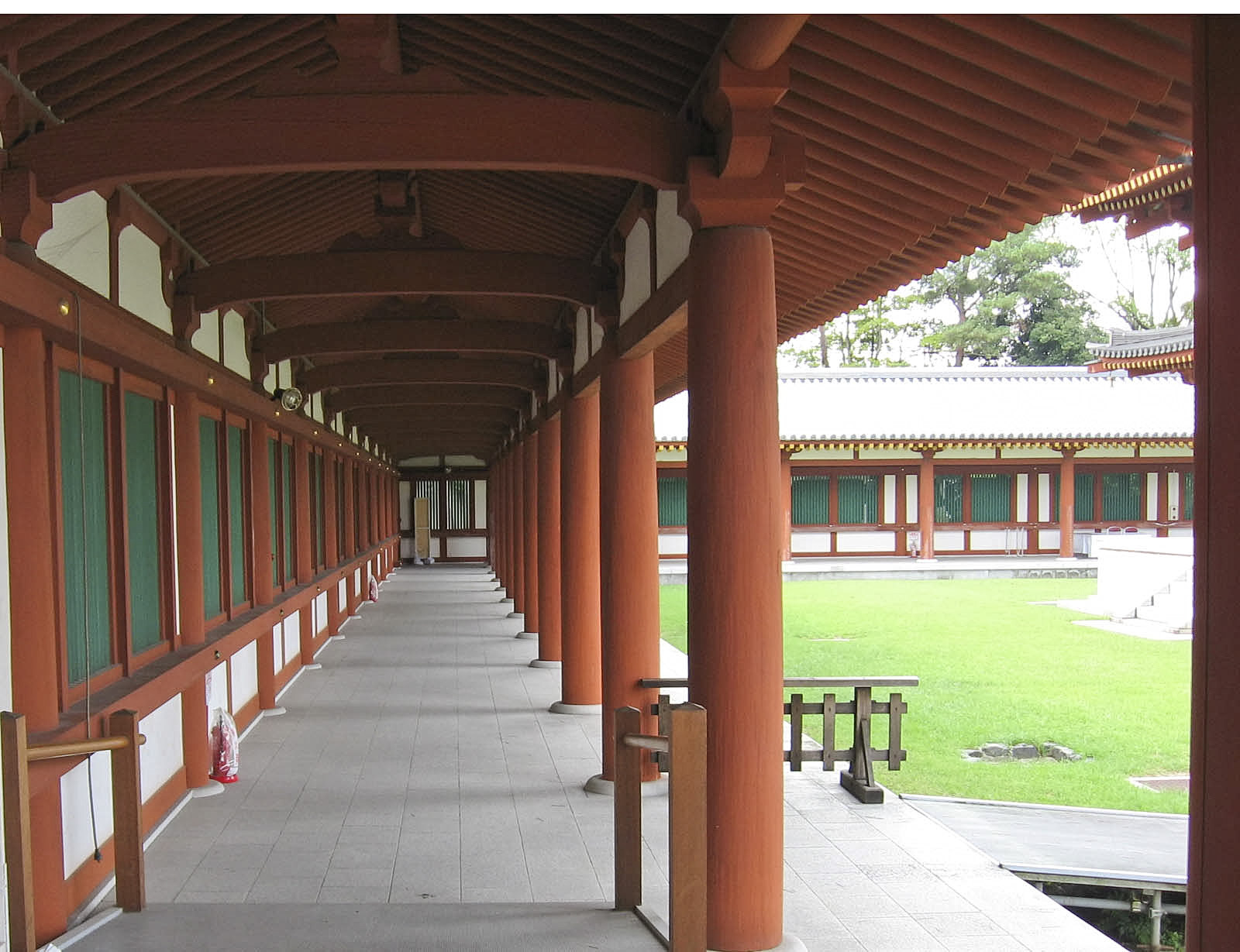
Yakushi-ji's kairō

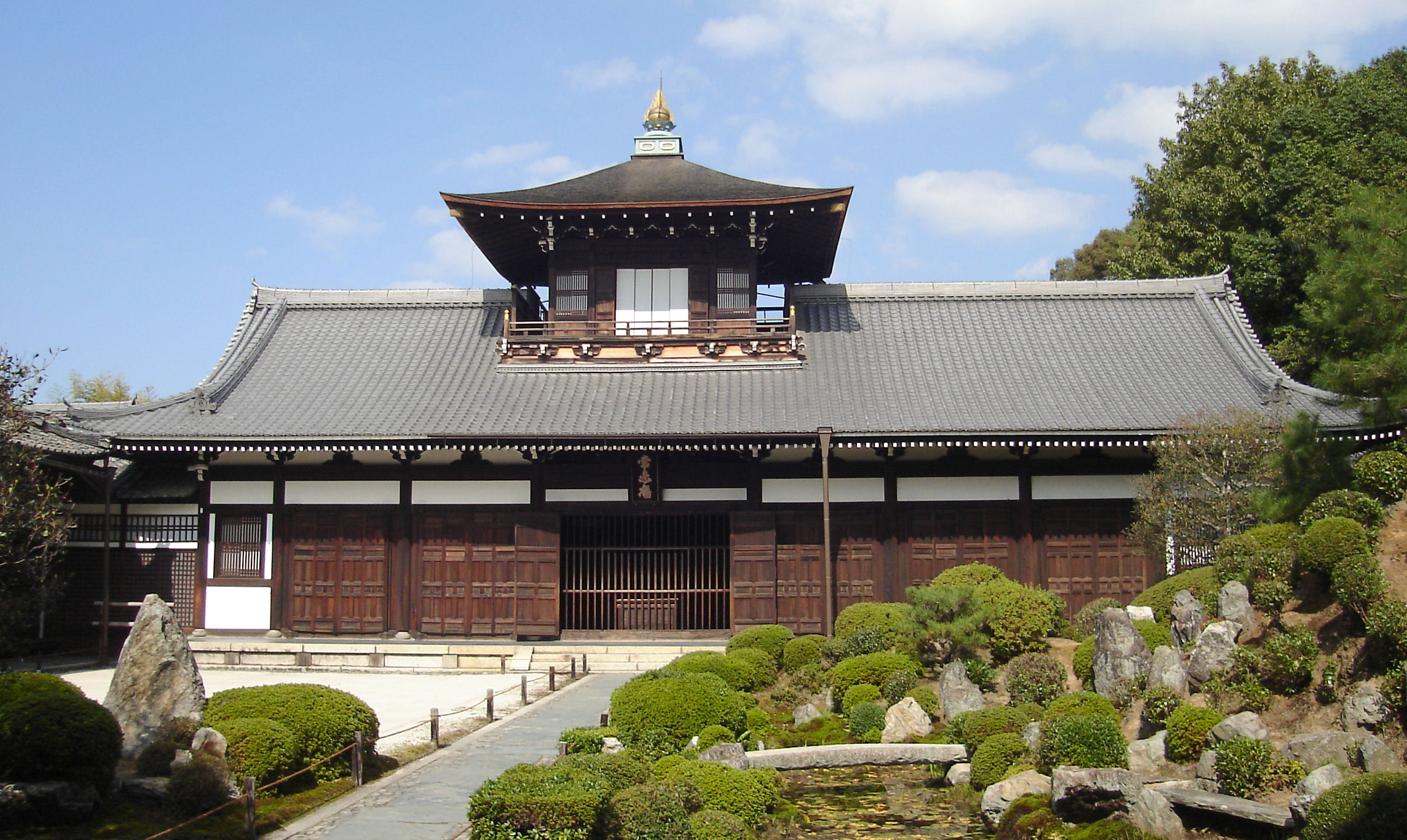
Tōfuku-ji's kaisan-dō

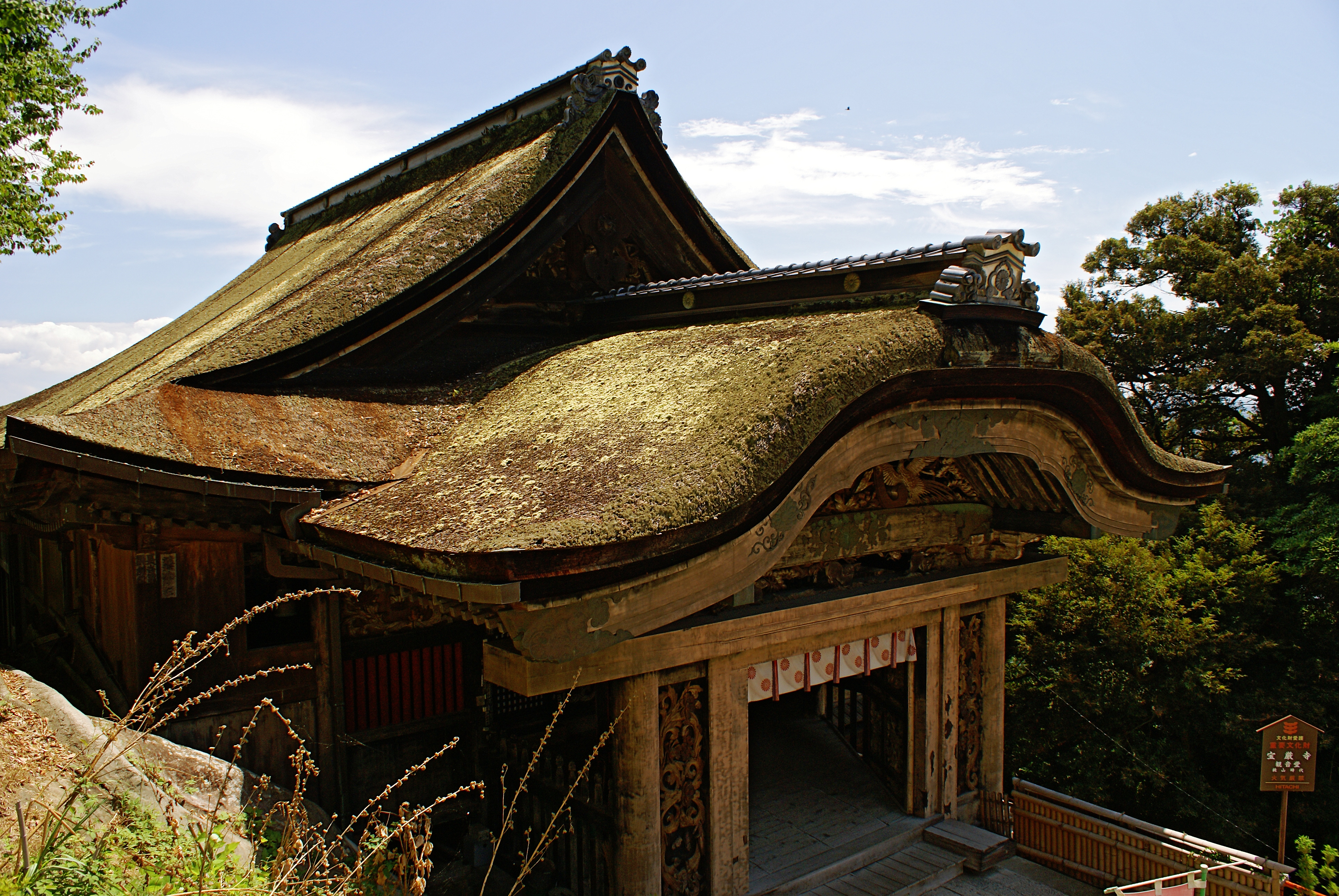
Hōgon-ji's karamon

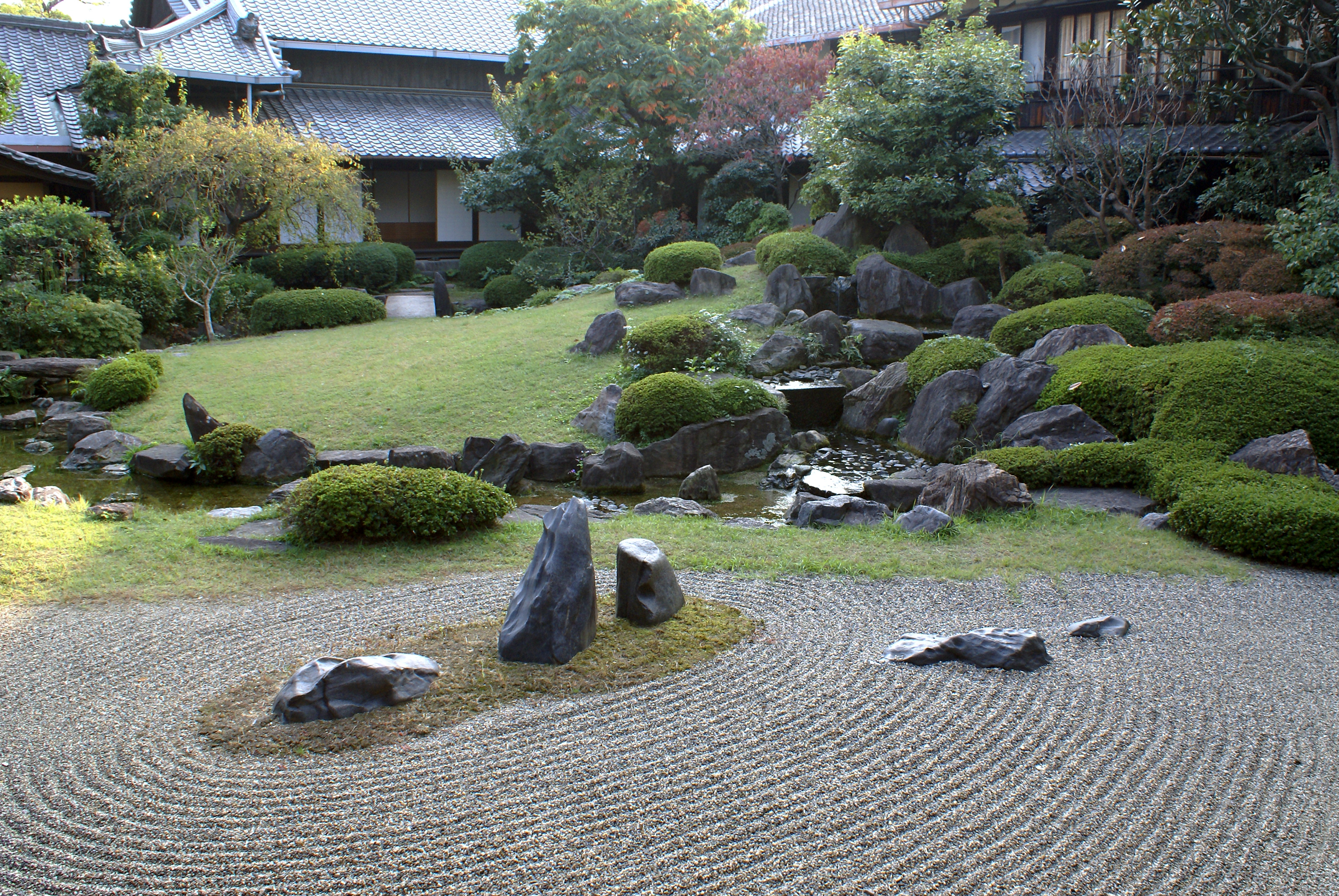
Shitennō-ji's karesansui

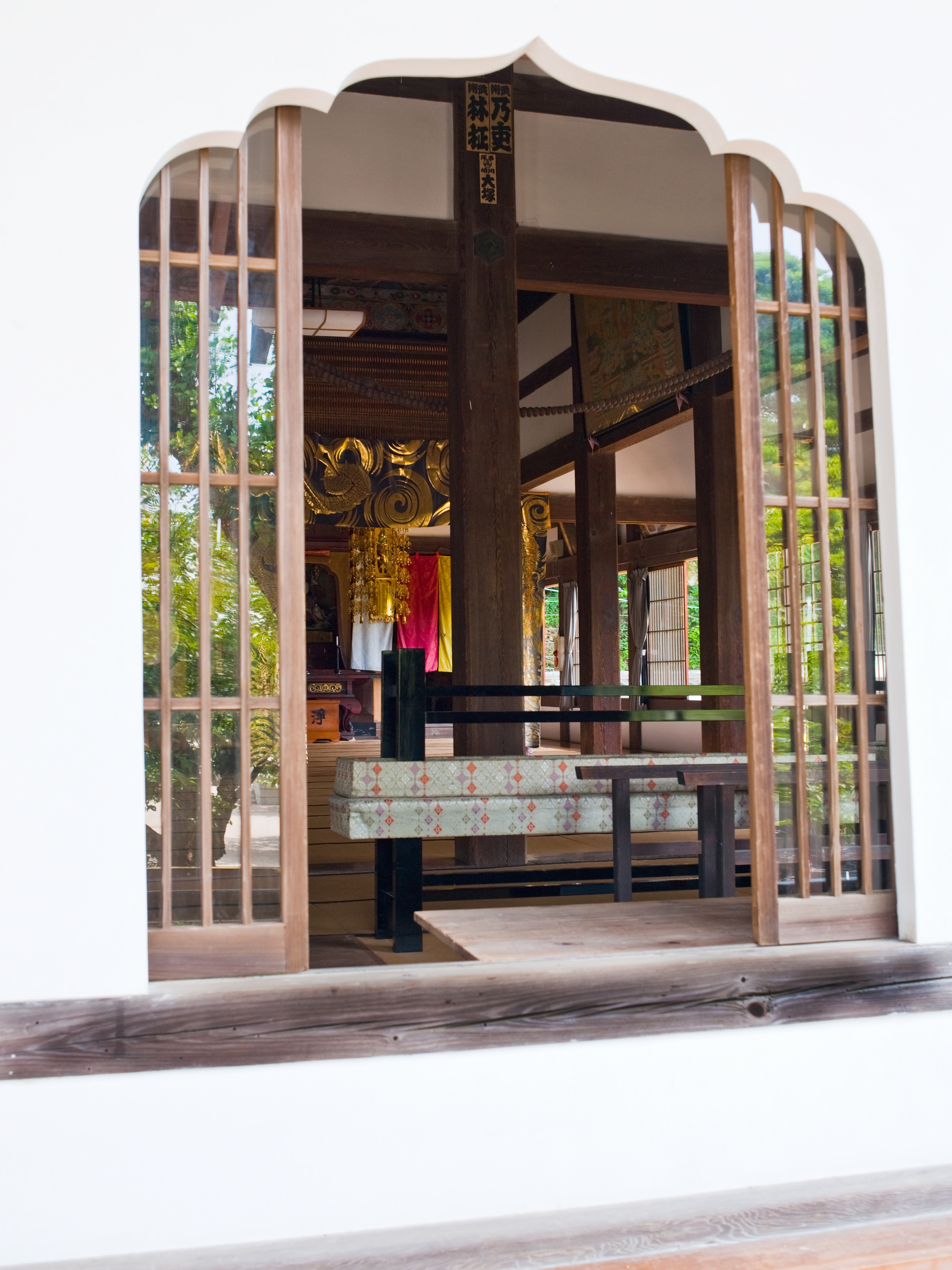
a katōmado

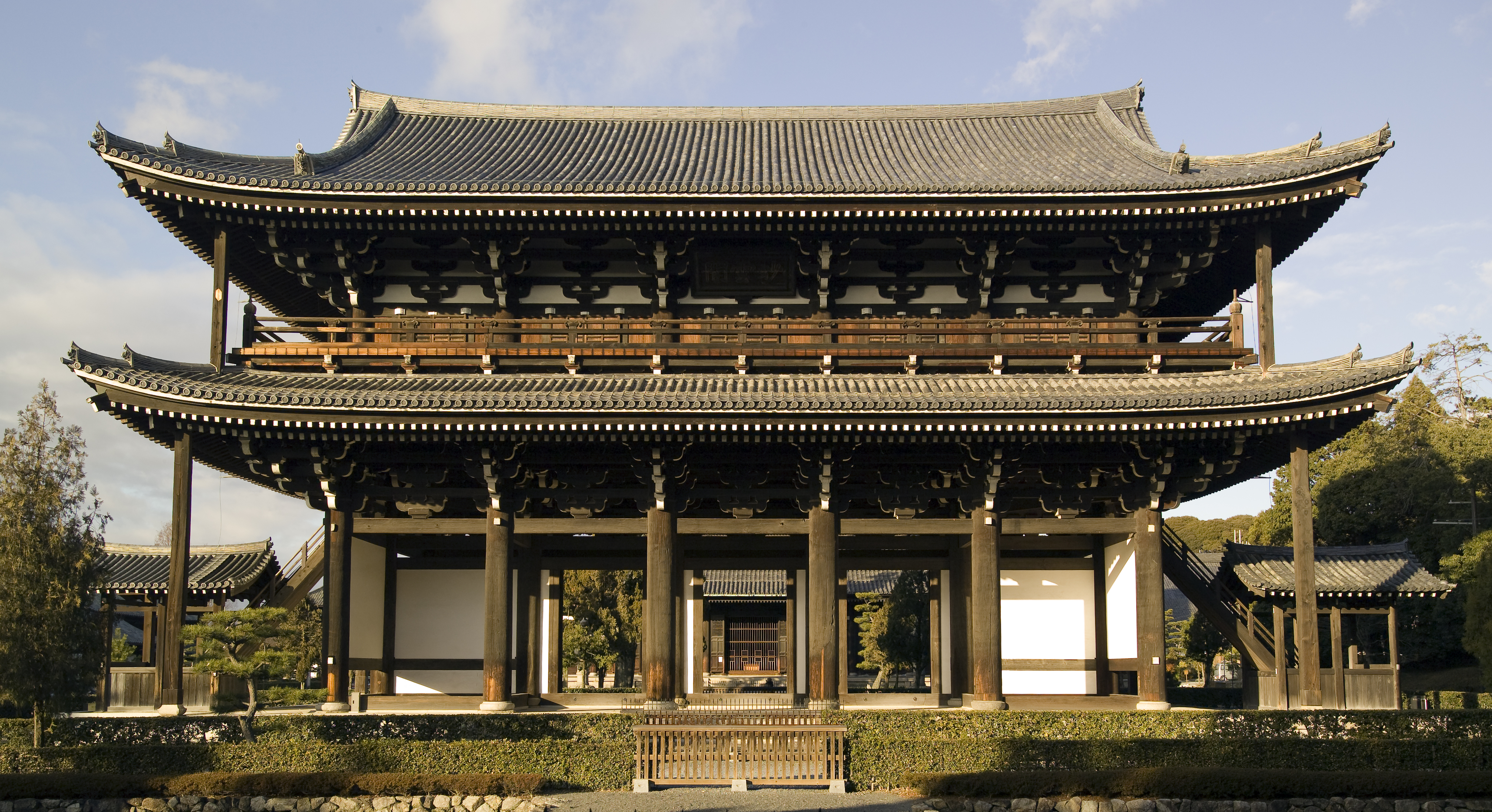
Tōfuku-ji's sanmon is 5 ken wide.

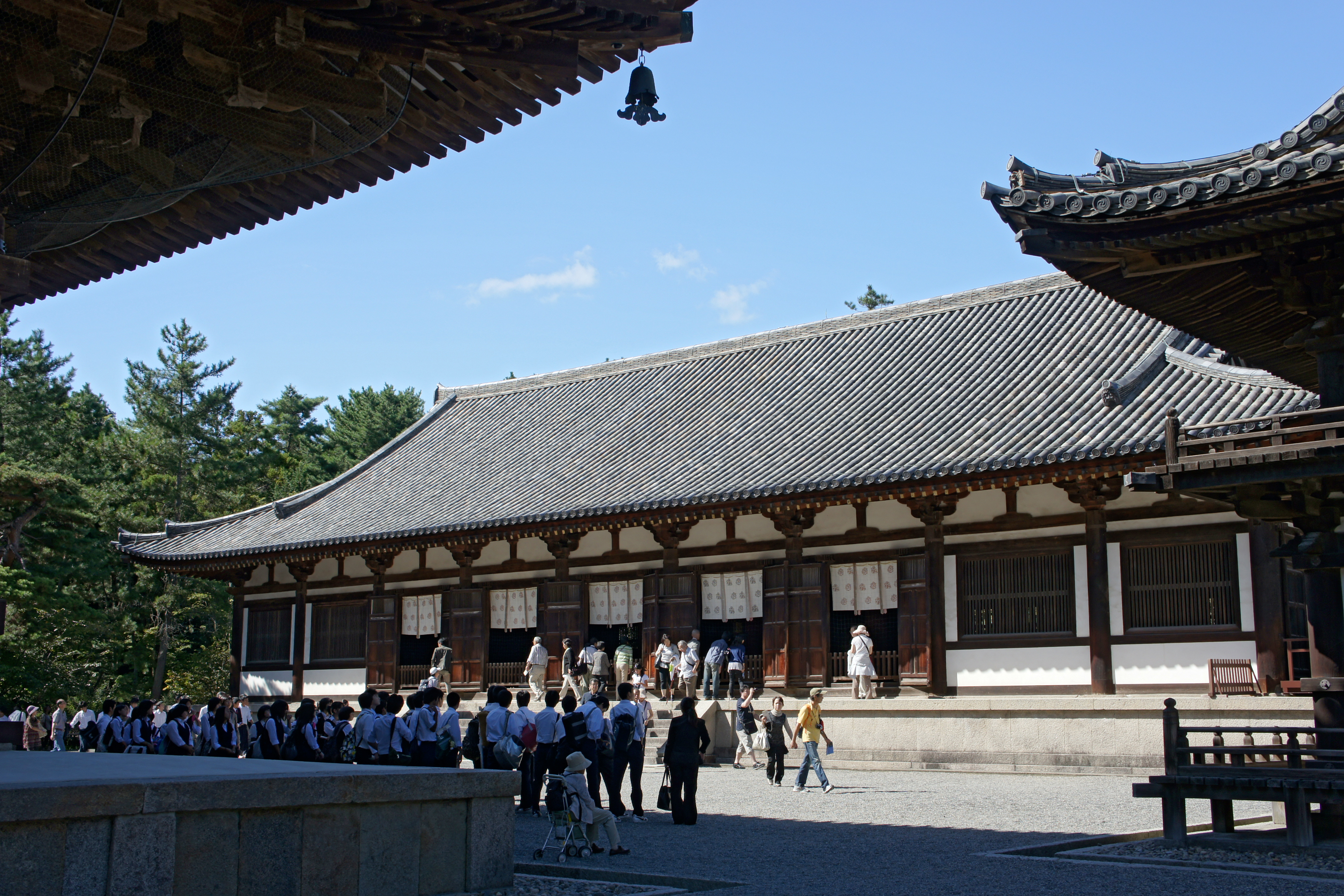
Kō-dō at Tōshōdai-ji

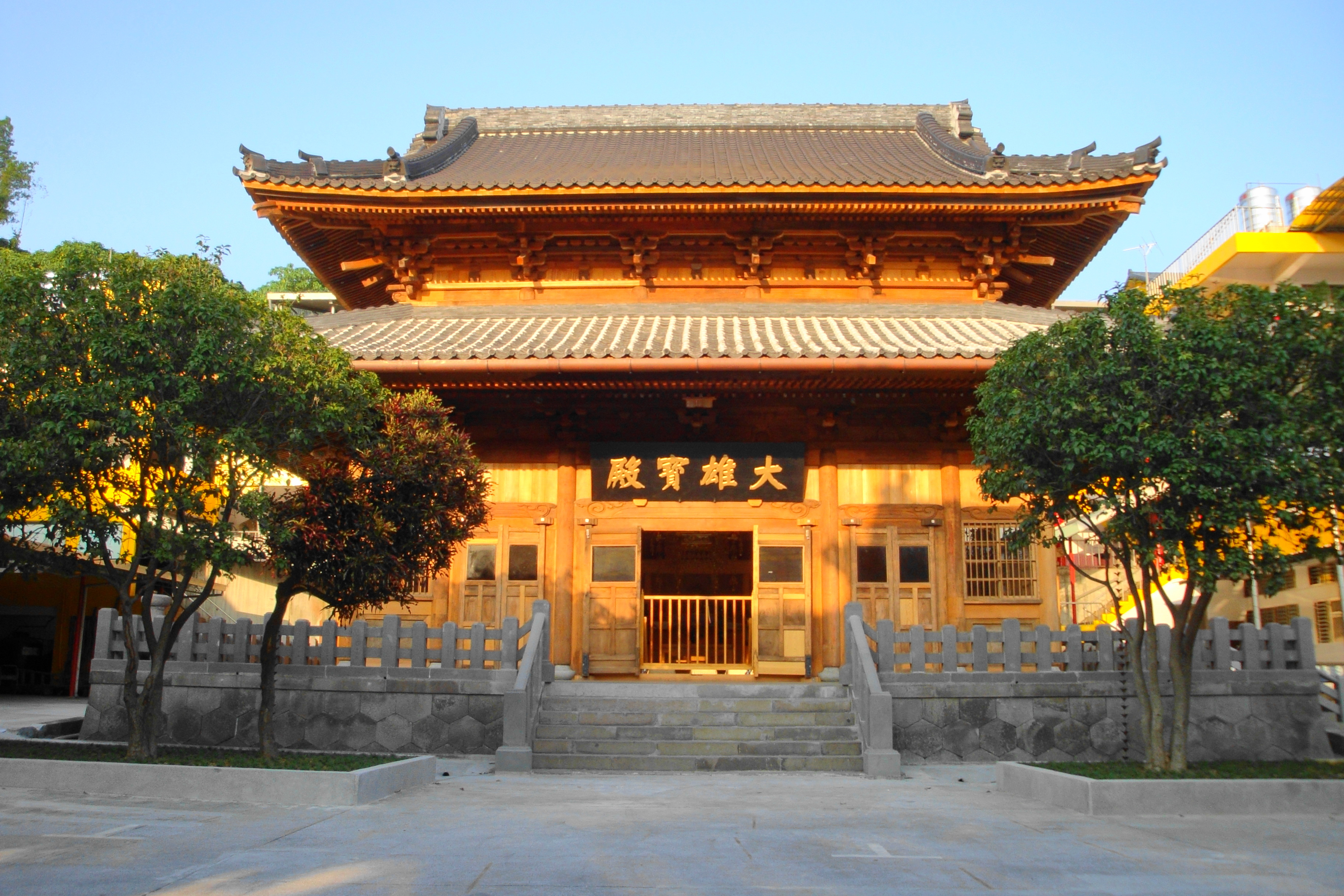
Kon-dō of Huguo Chan Buddhist Temple of The Linji School in Taipei, Taiwan

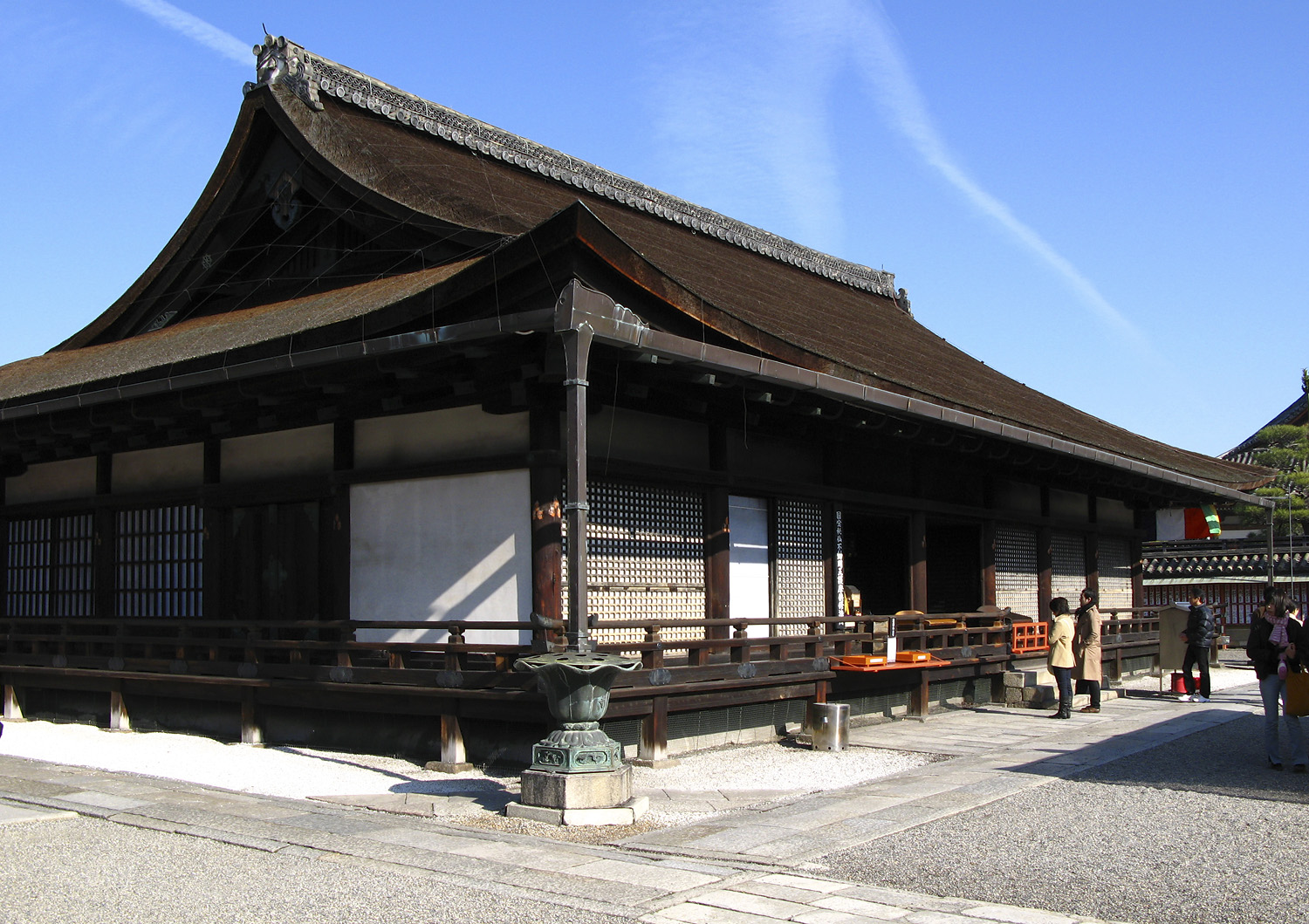
Miei-dō at Tō-ji

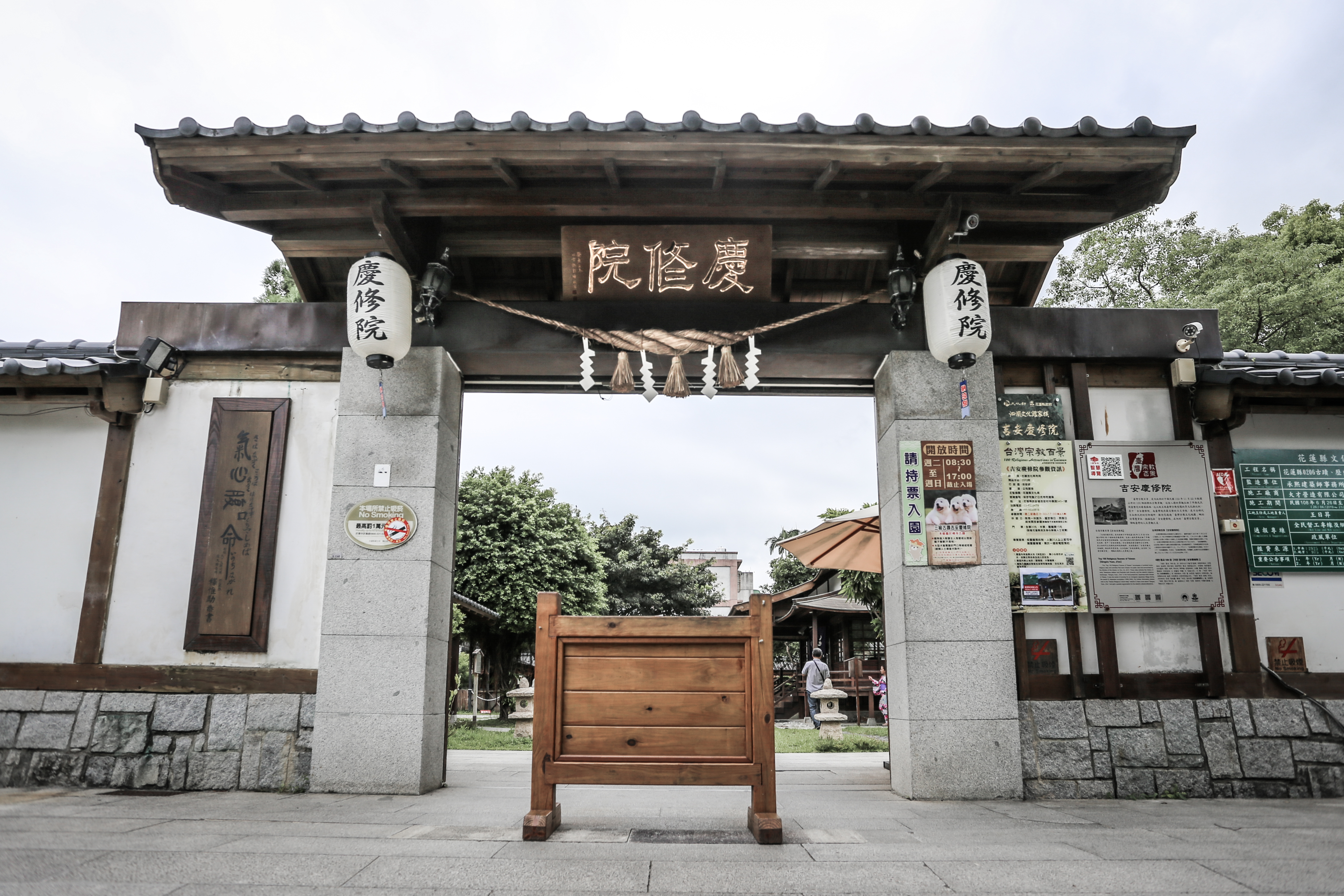
Mon of Hualien Ji'an Shrine in Taiwan

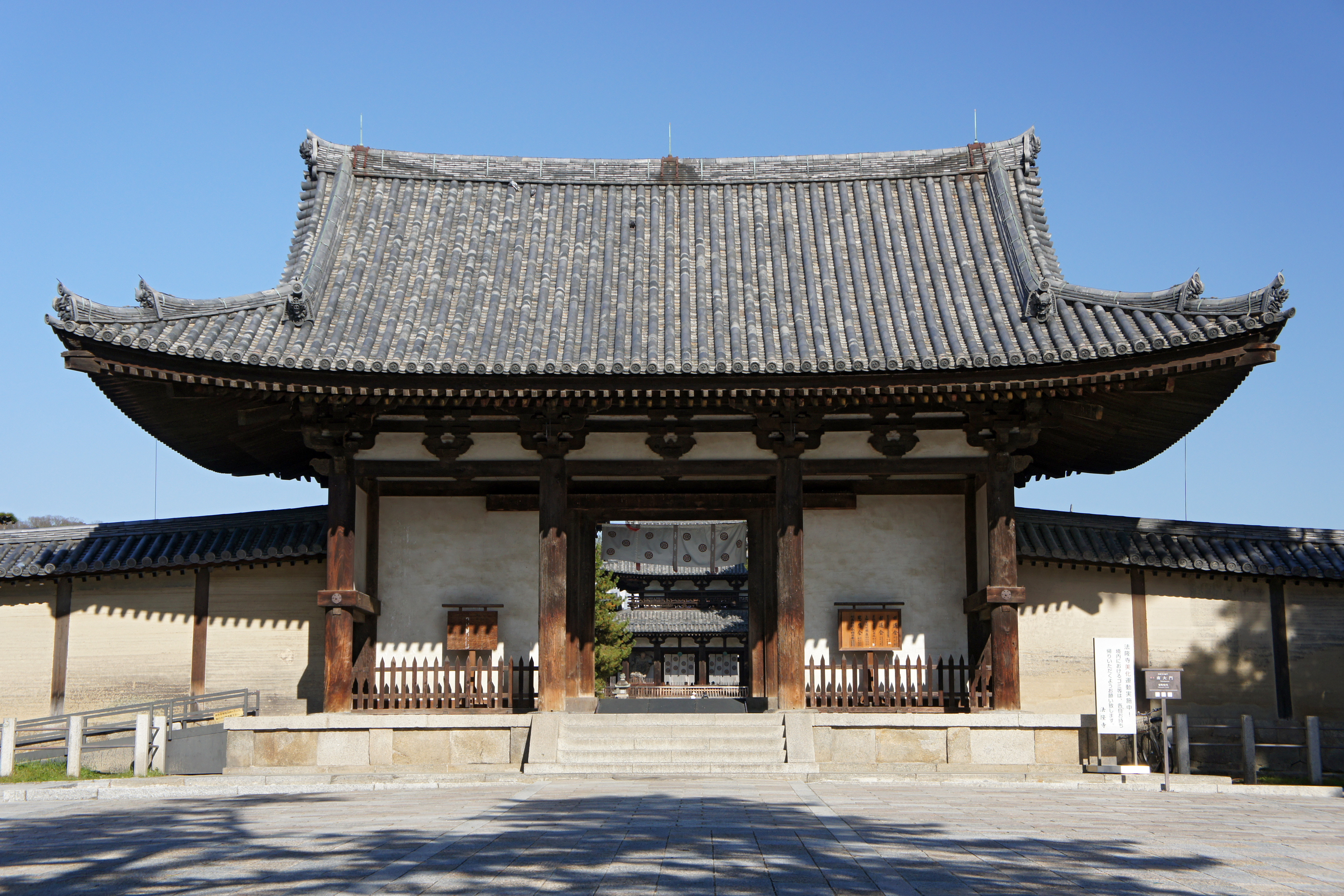
Nandaimon at Hōryū-ji

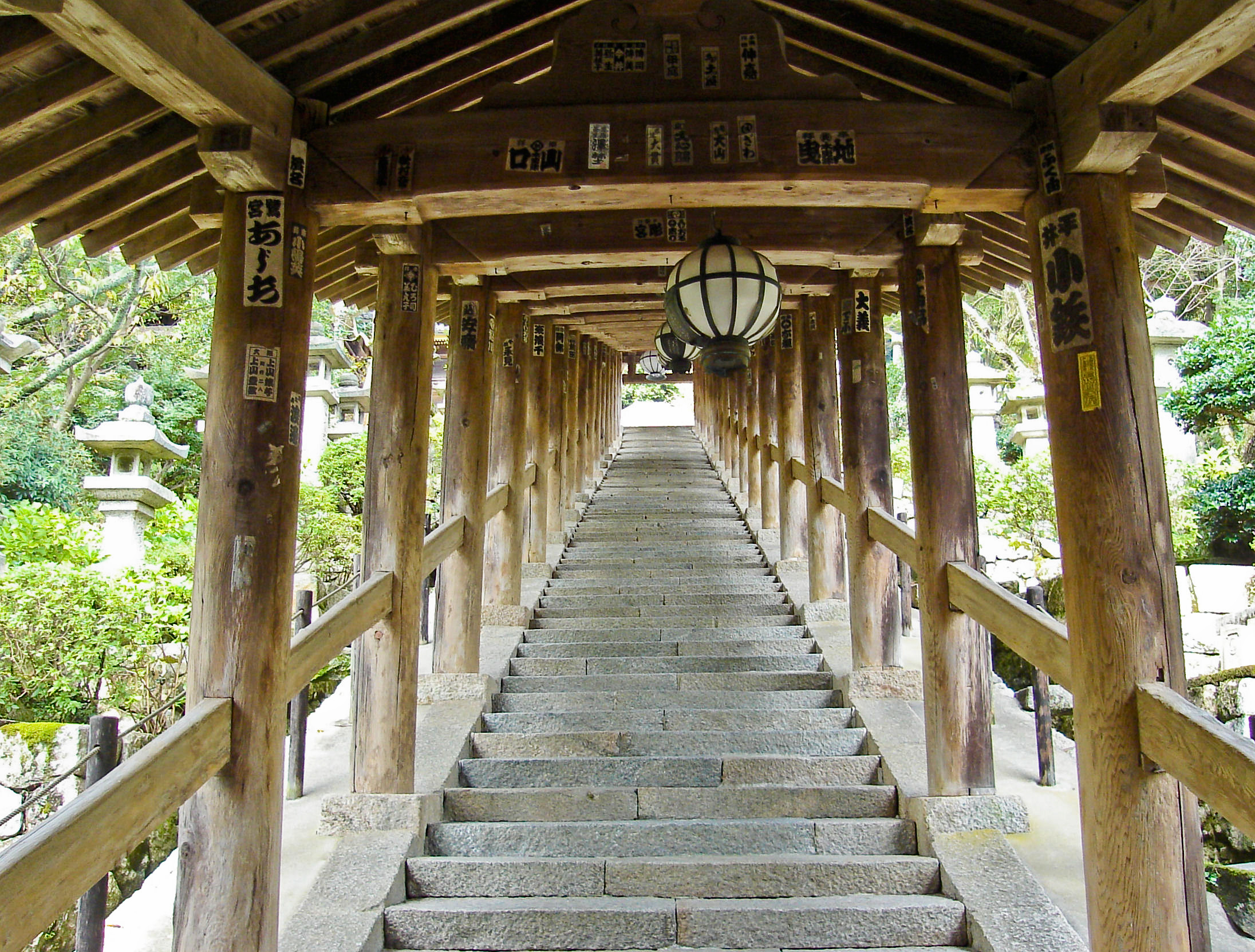
The noborirō at Nara's Hase-dera

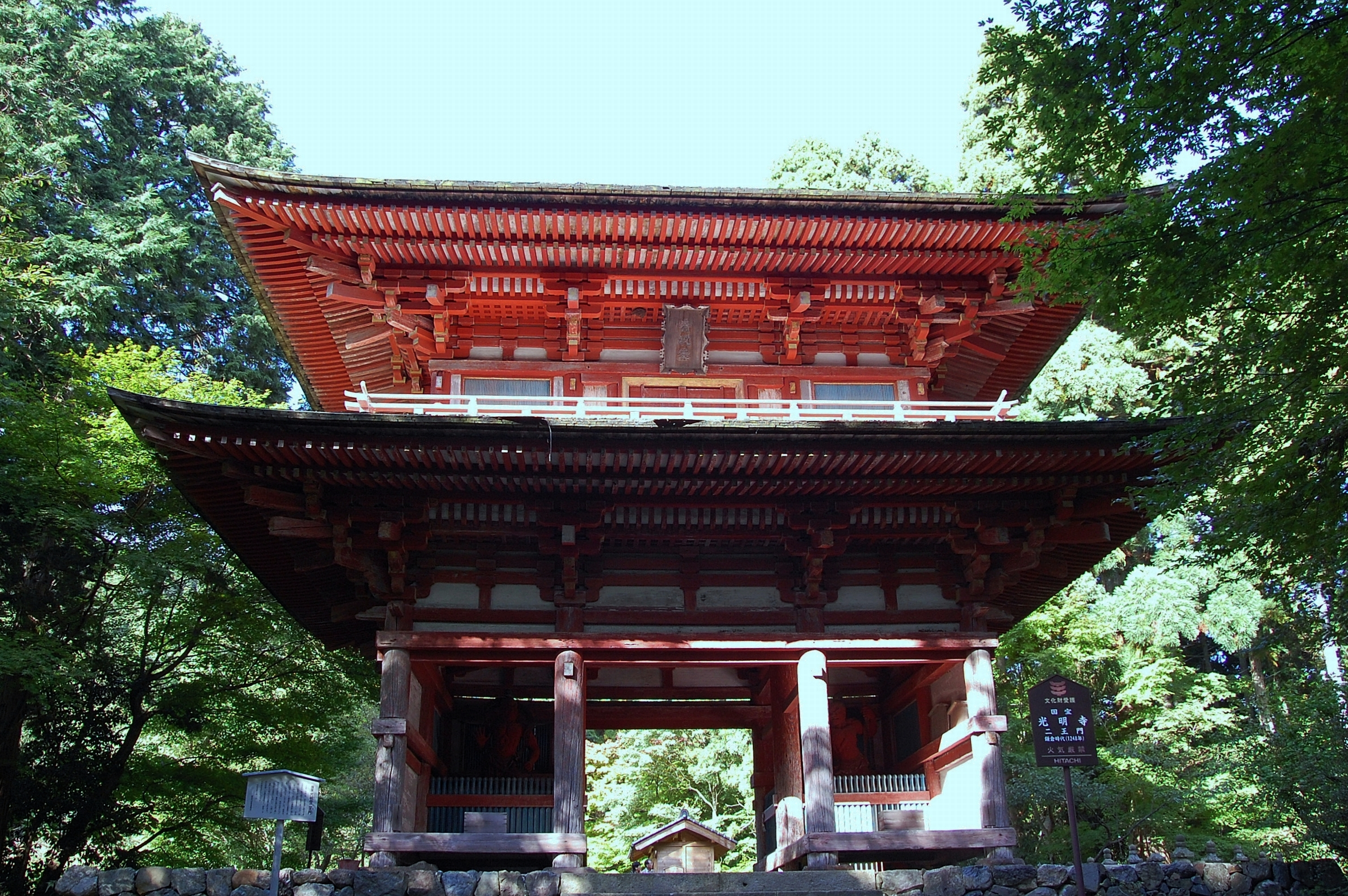
Nijūmon at Kōmyō-ji in Ayabe.

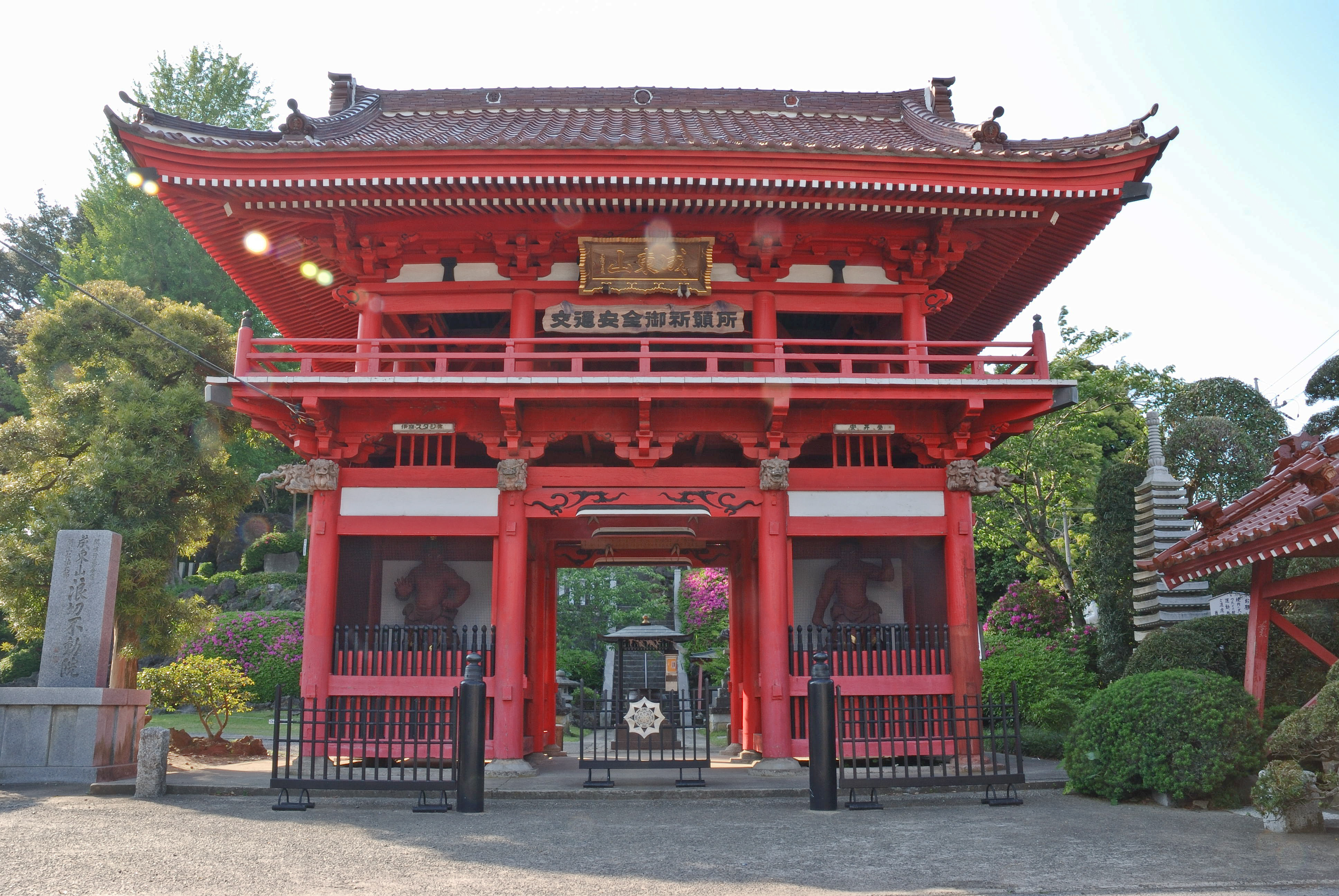
A niōmon

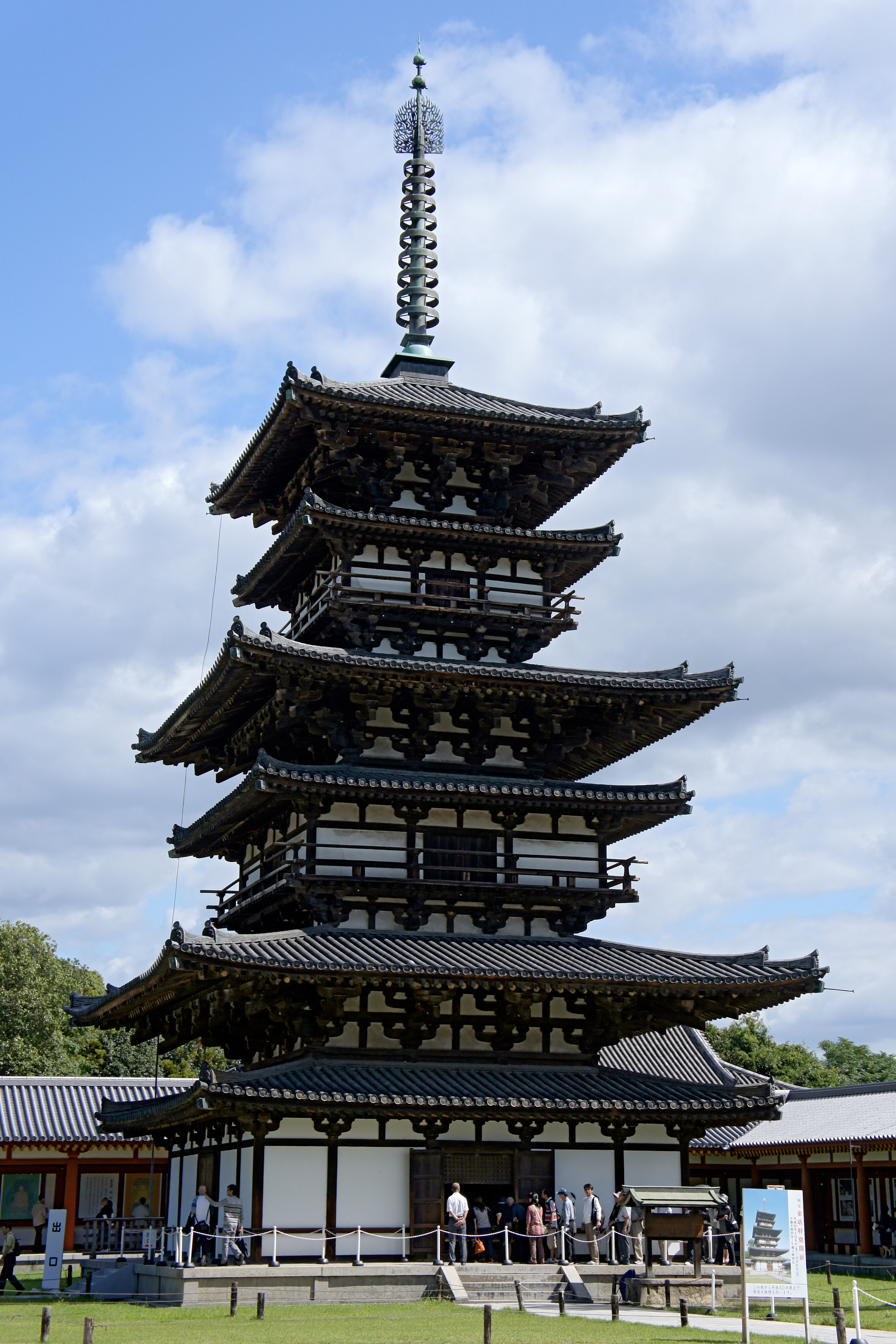
(East) Pagoda at Yakushi-ji in Nara

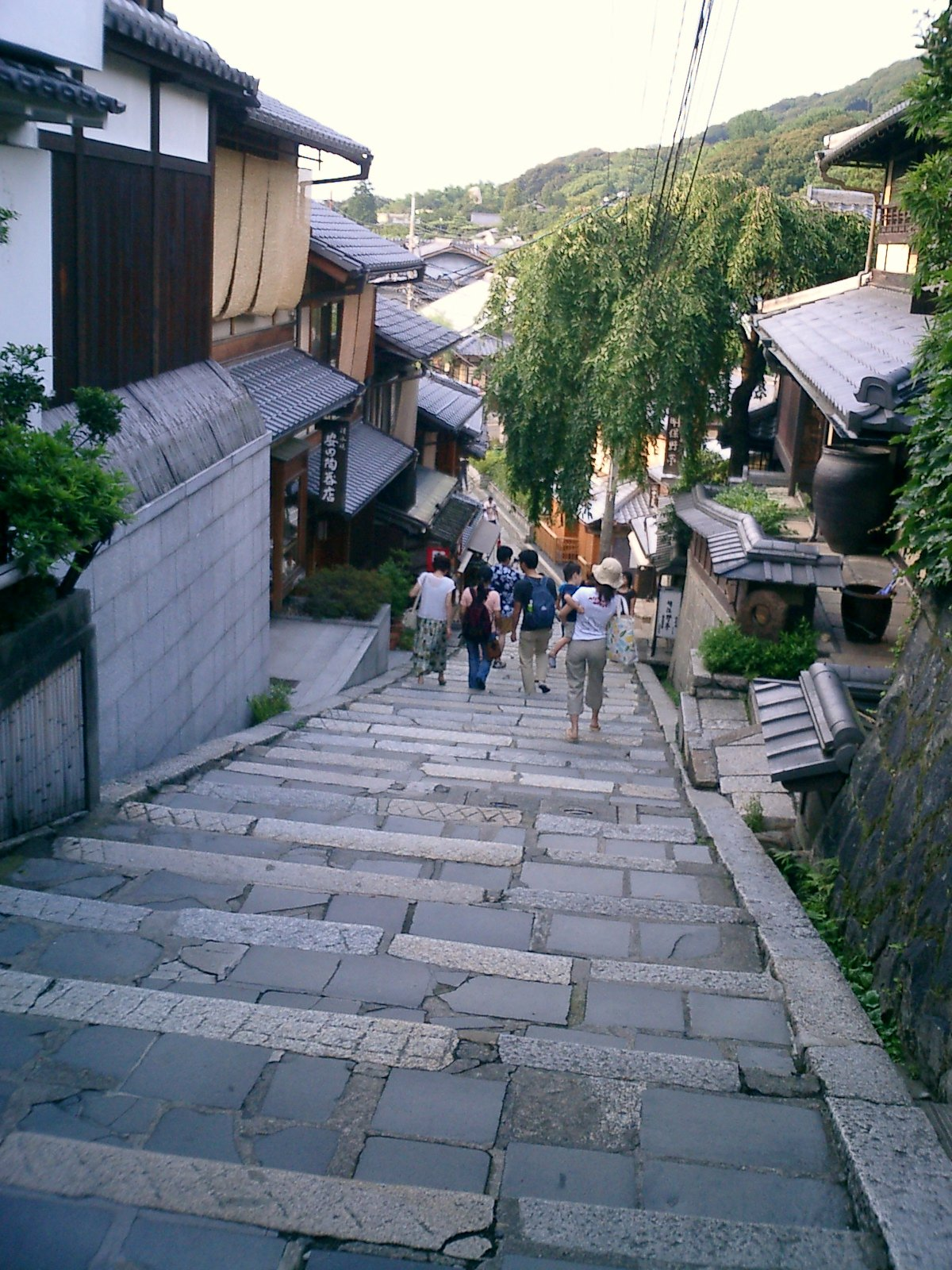
Kiyomizu-dera's sandō

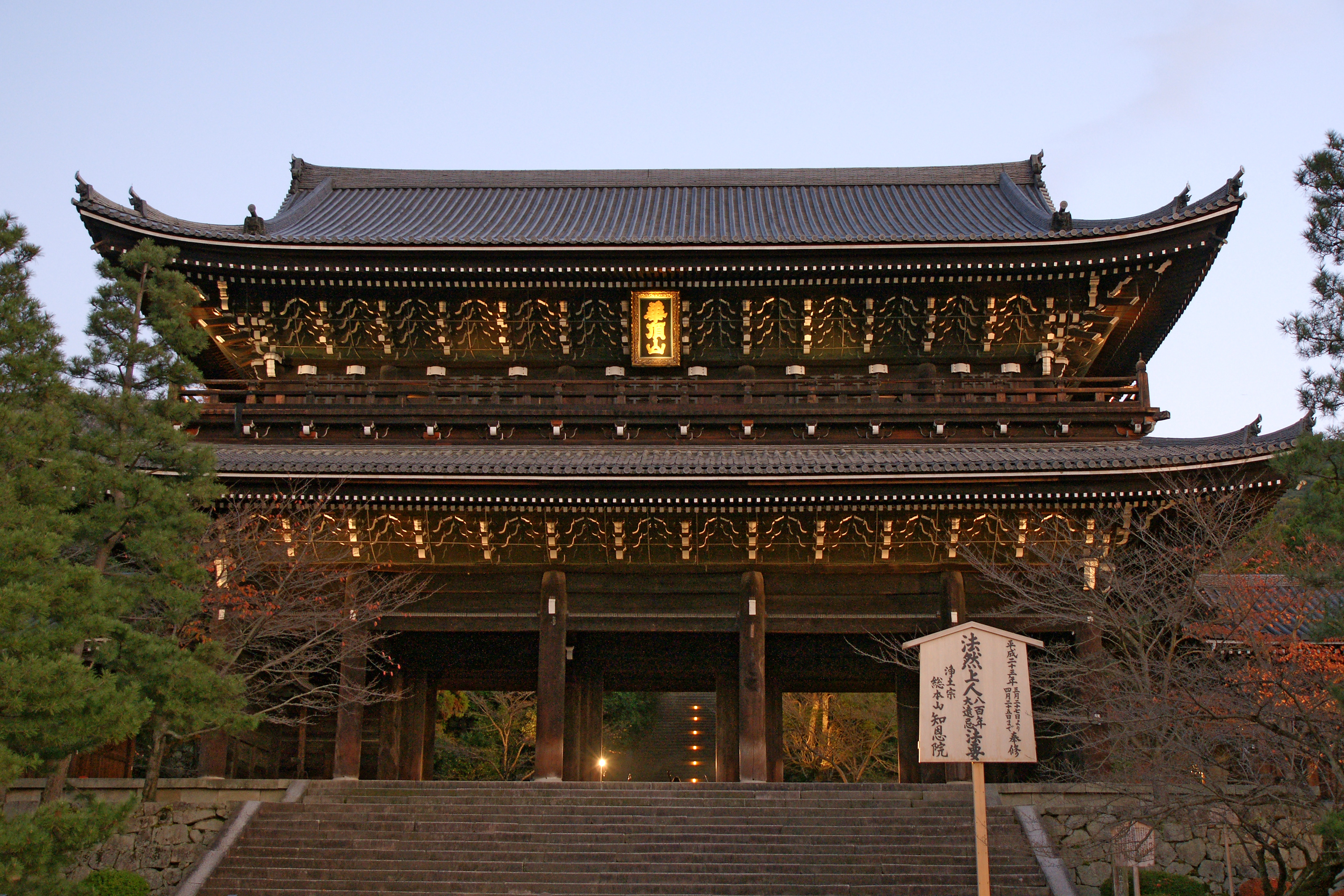
A high rank, five-bay sanmon at Chion-in. Note the sanrō.

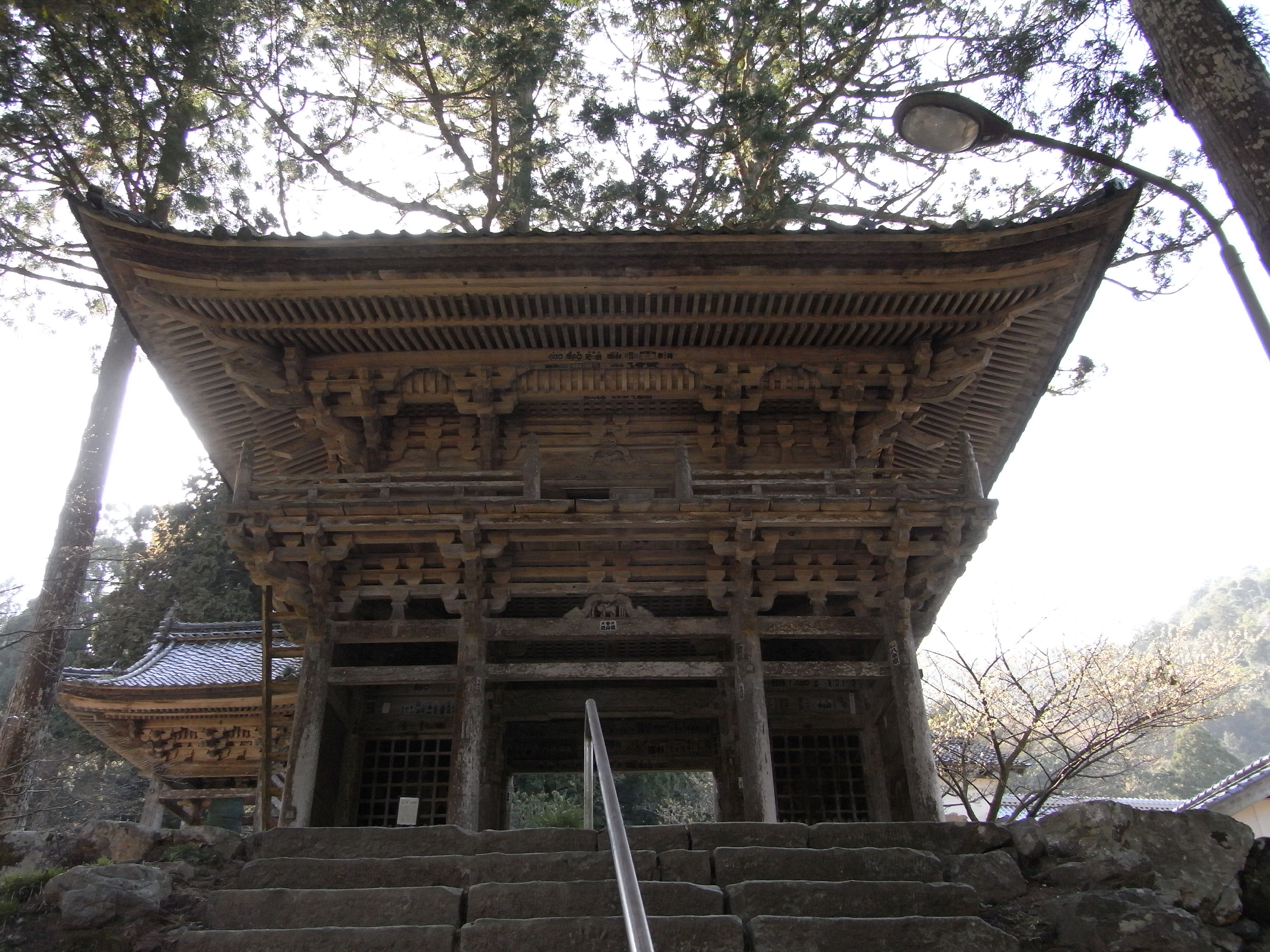
A middle rank, three-bay sanmon at Myōtsū-ji

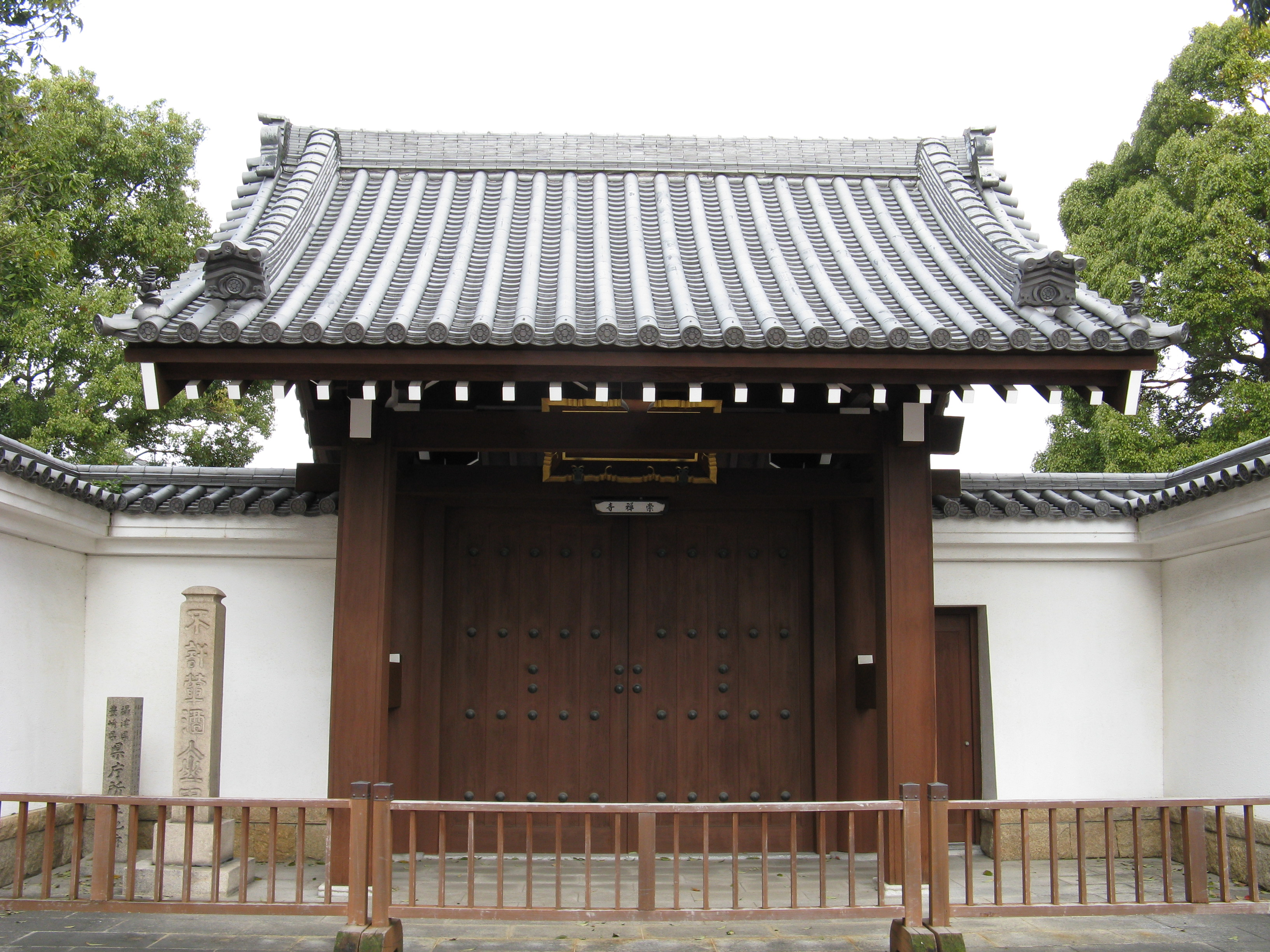
A low rank sanmon at Sozen-ji in Osaka

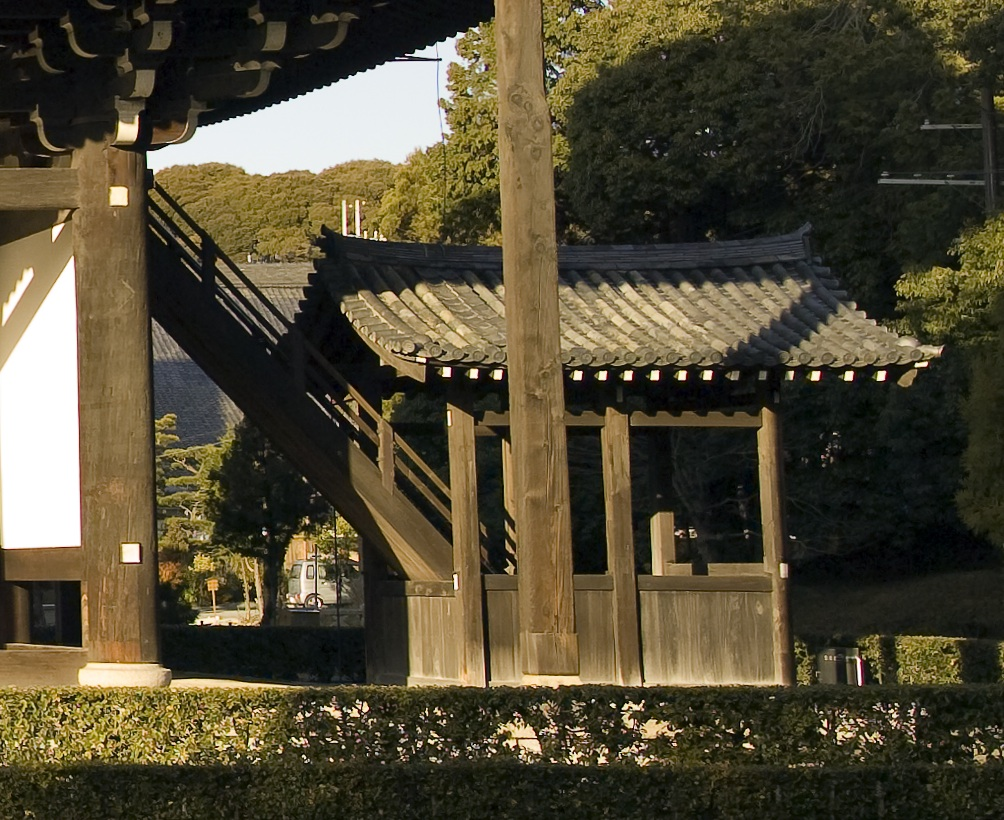
The sanrō of Tōfuku-ji's sanmon. (See also the sanmon's photo above.)

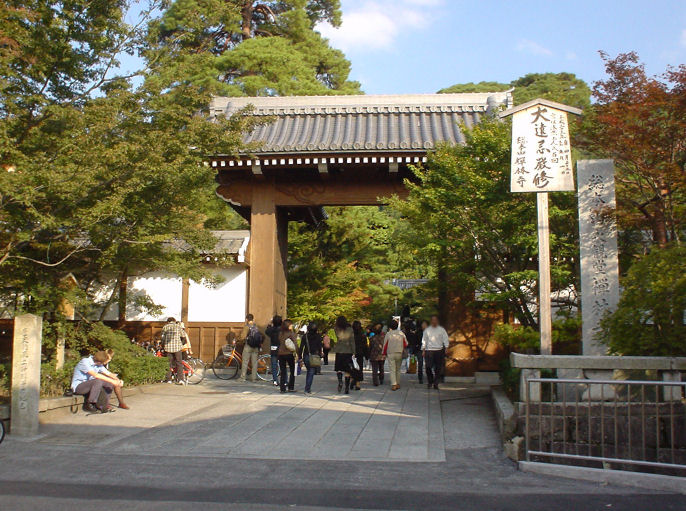
Zenrin-ji's sōmon

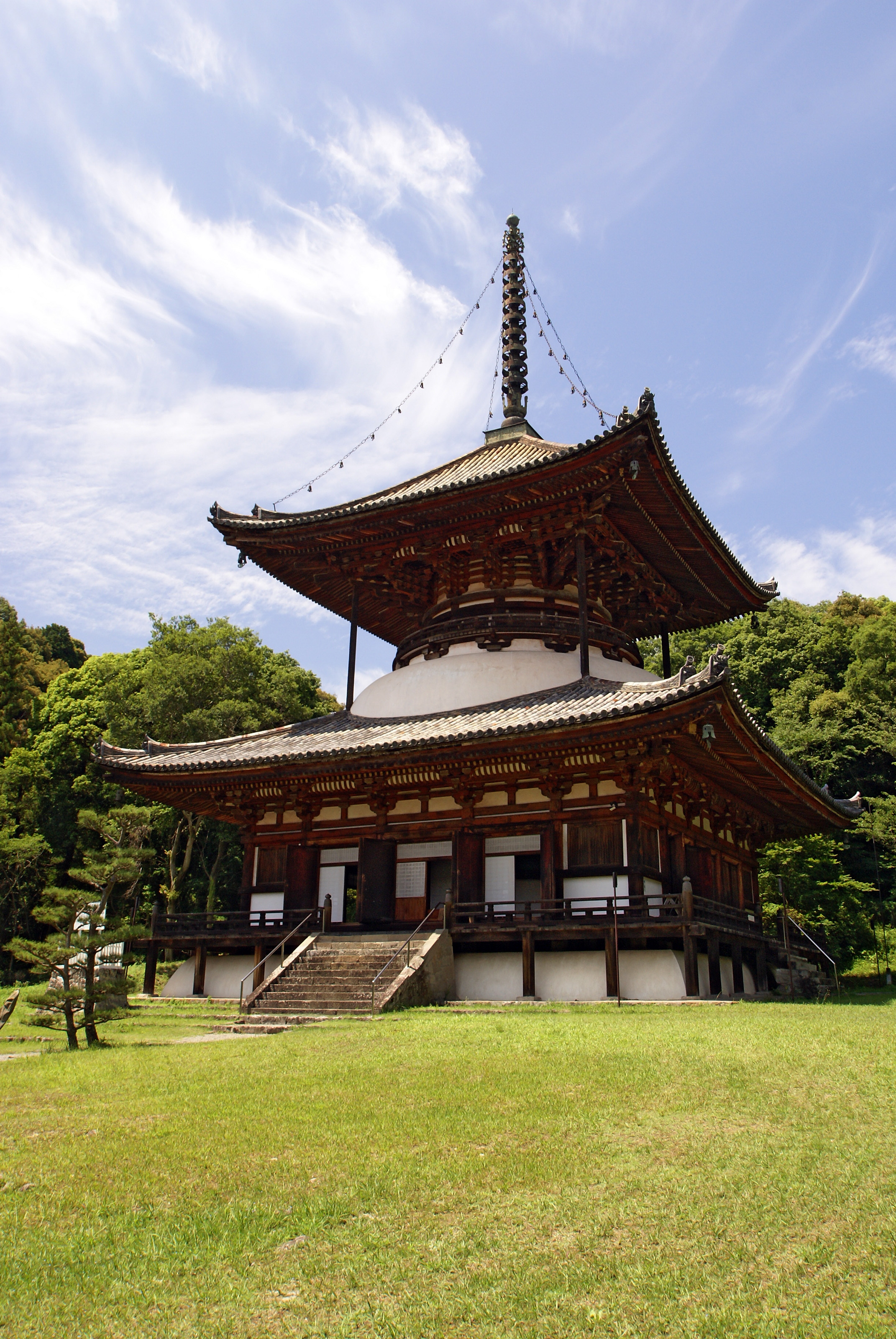
Negoro-ji's large sōrin (metal spire) on top of a daitō (large tahōtō)

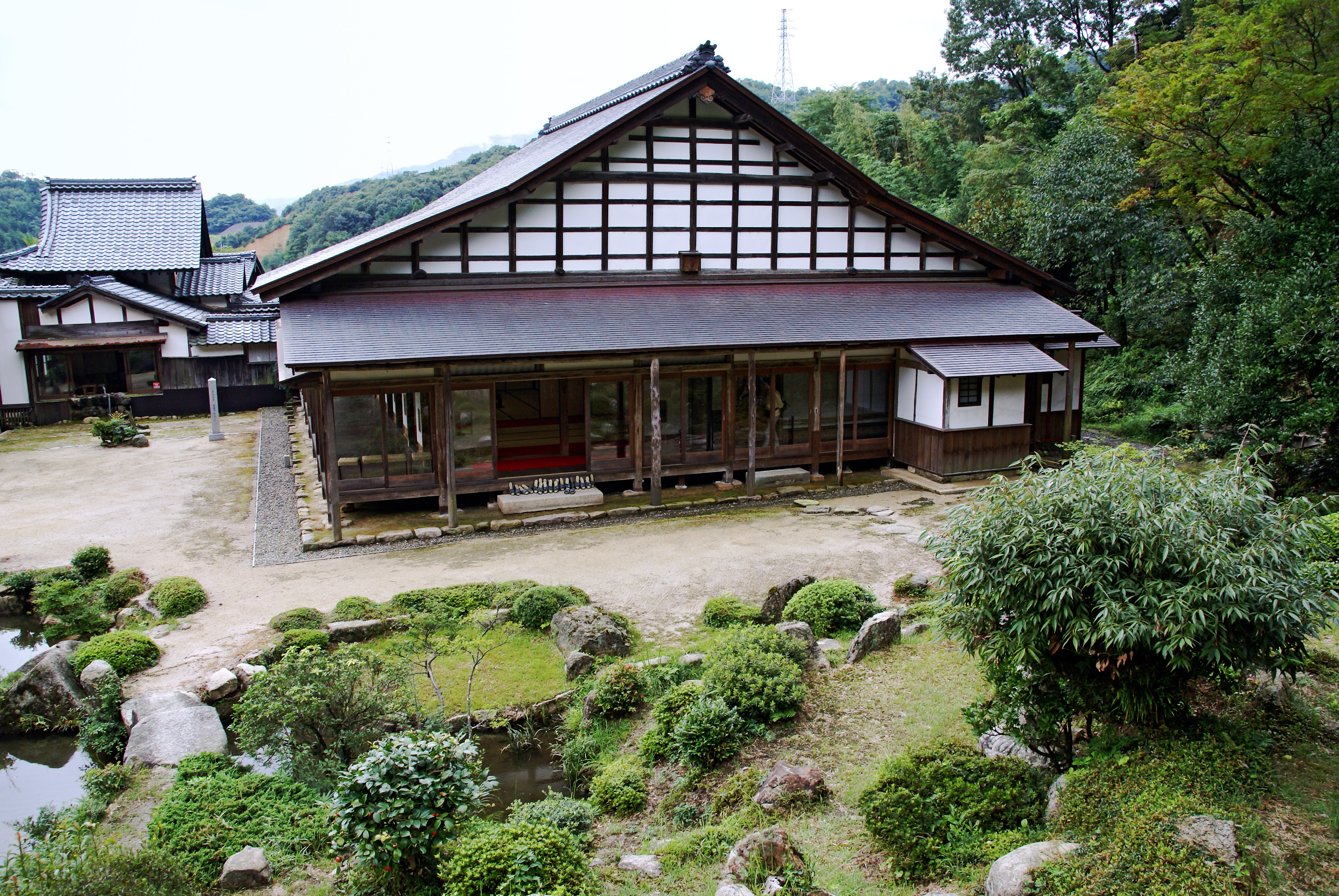
Saifuku-ji's shoin

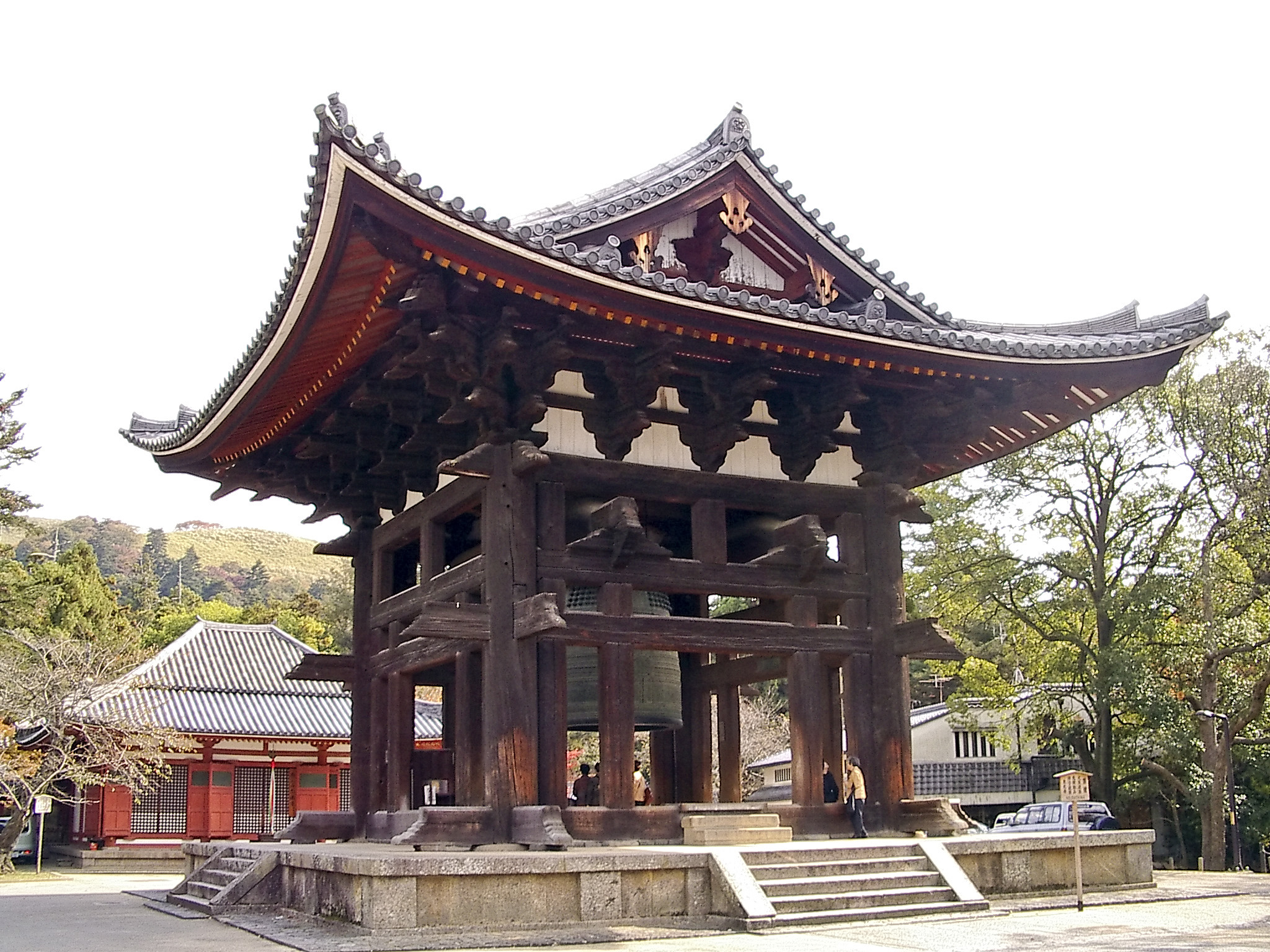
Tōdai-ji's shōrō (an early type)

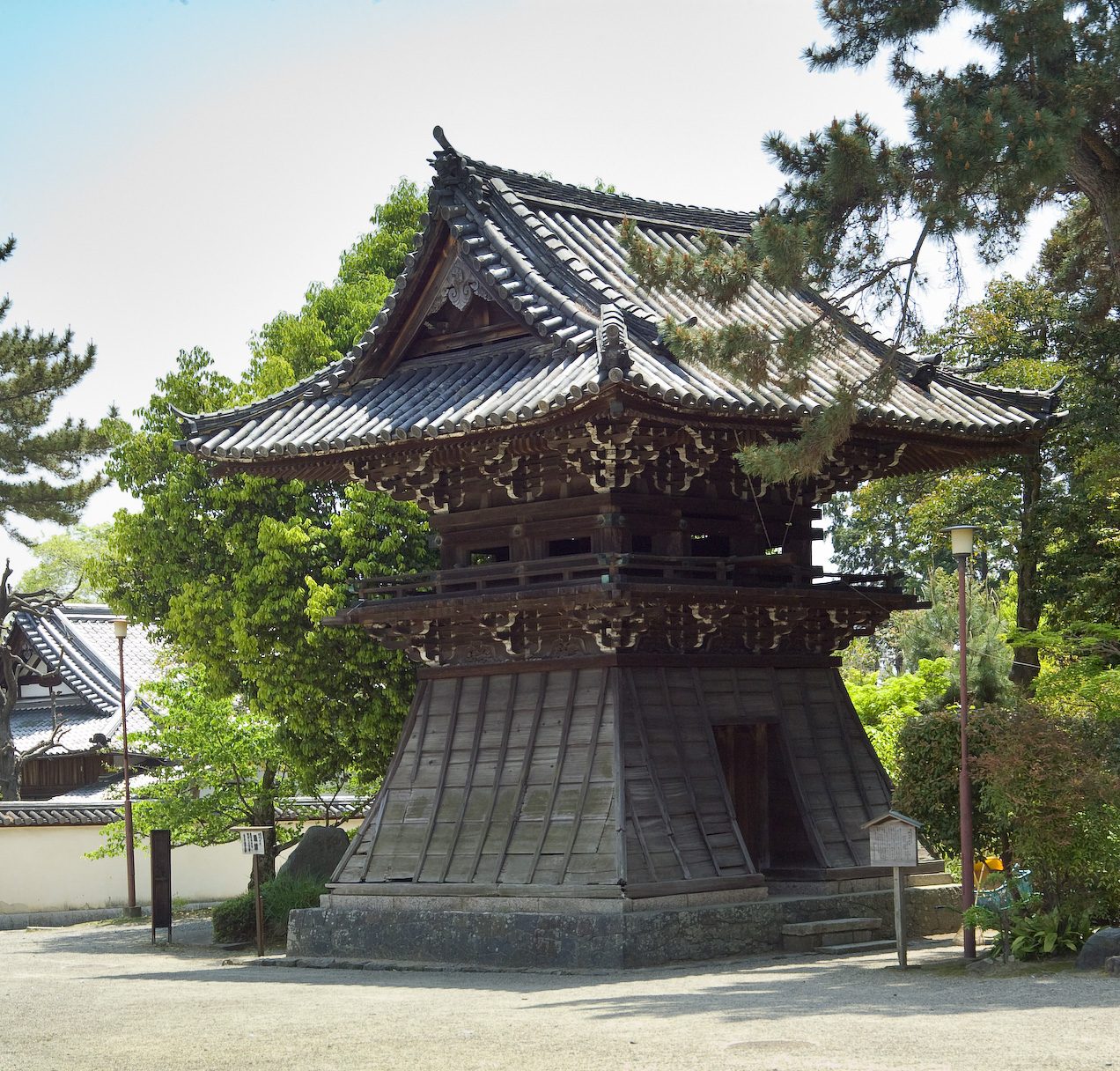
Saidai-ji's shōrō (a later type)

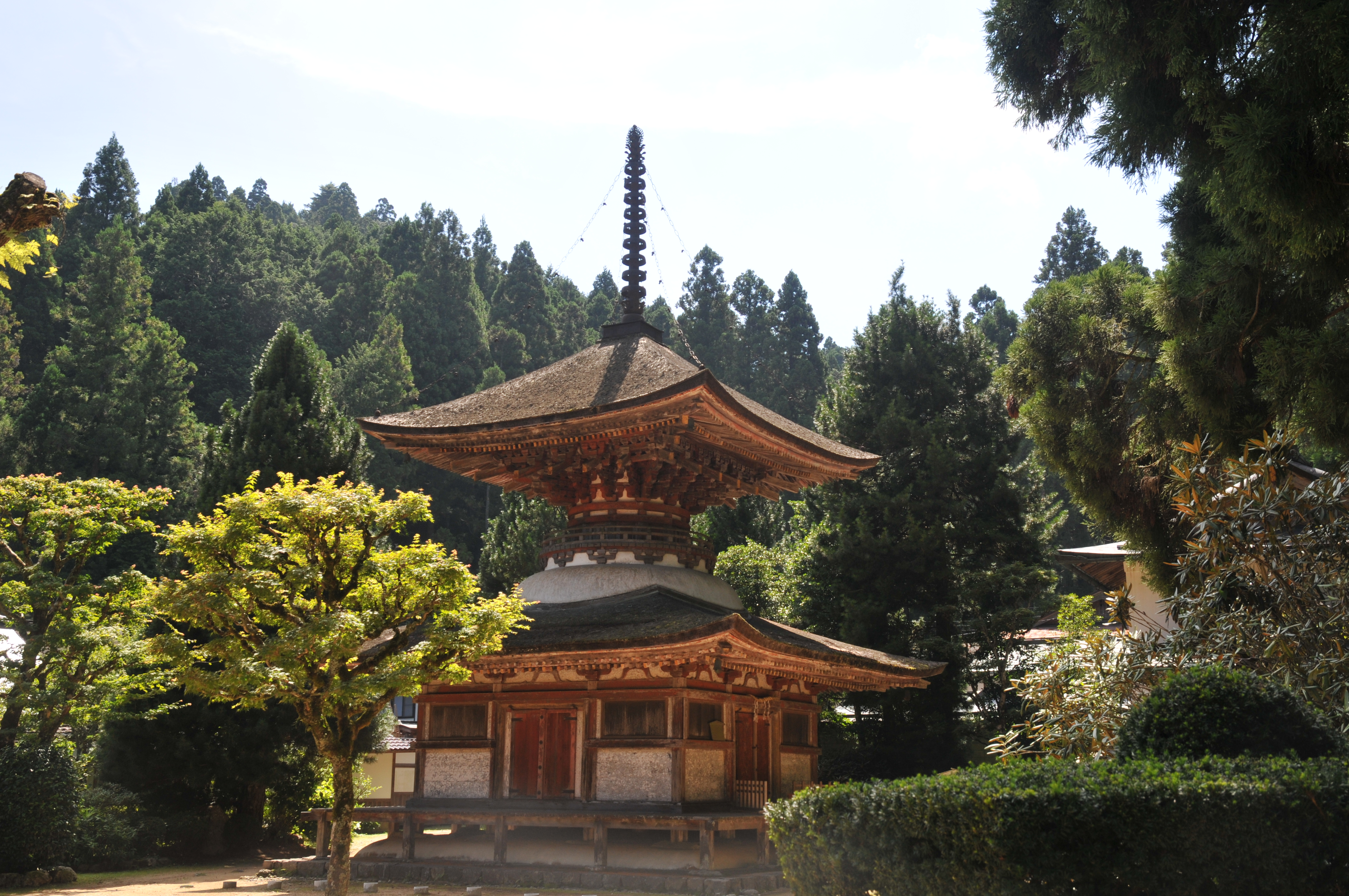
Kongō Sanmai-in's tahōtō (nijū-no-tō)

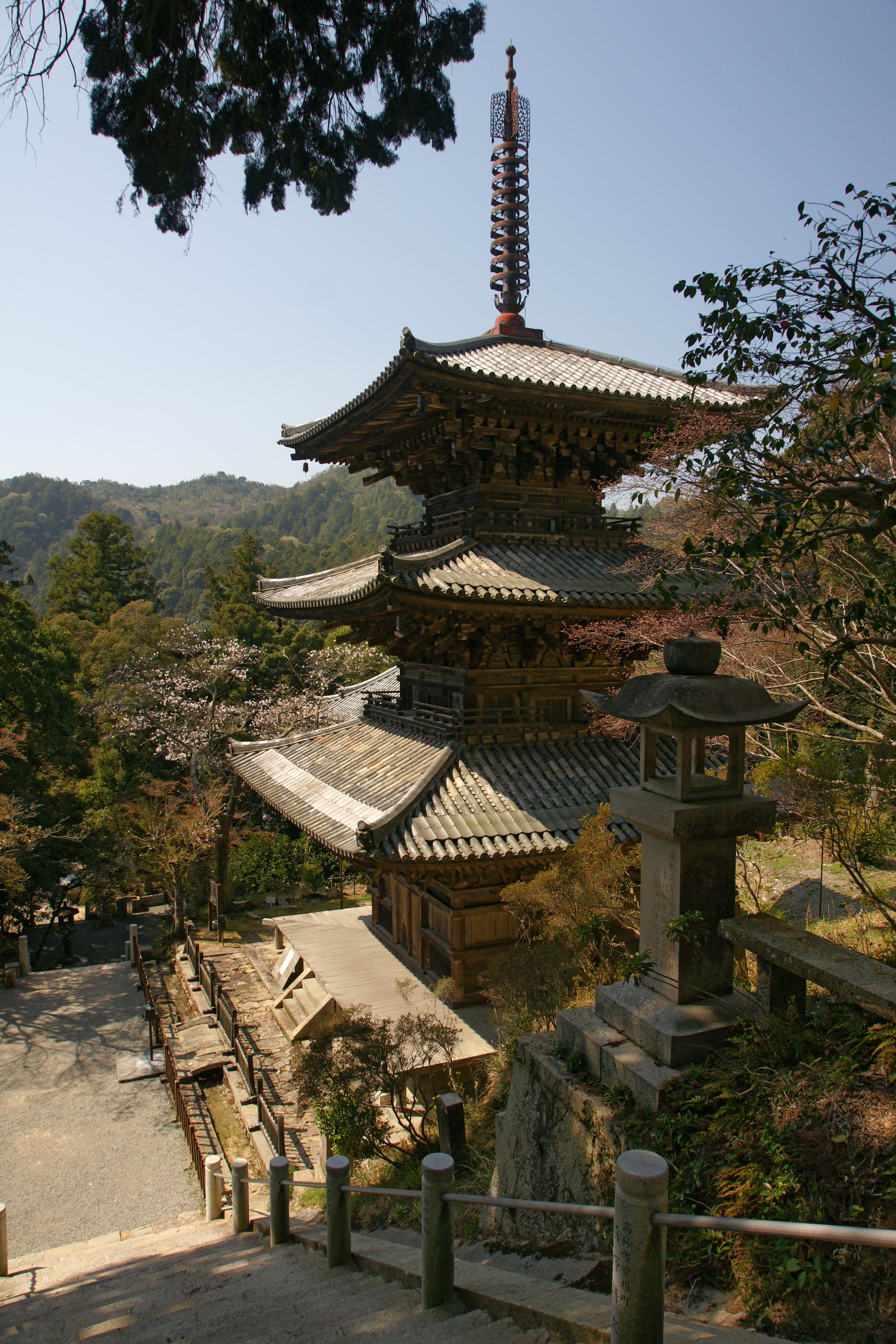
Ichijō-ji's three-tiered pagoda (sanjū-no-tō)

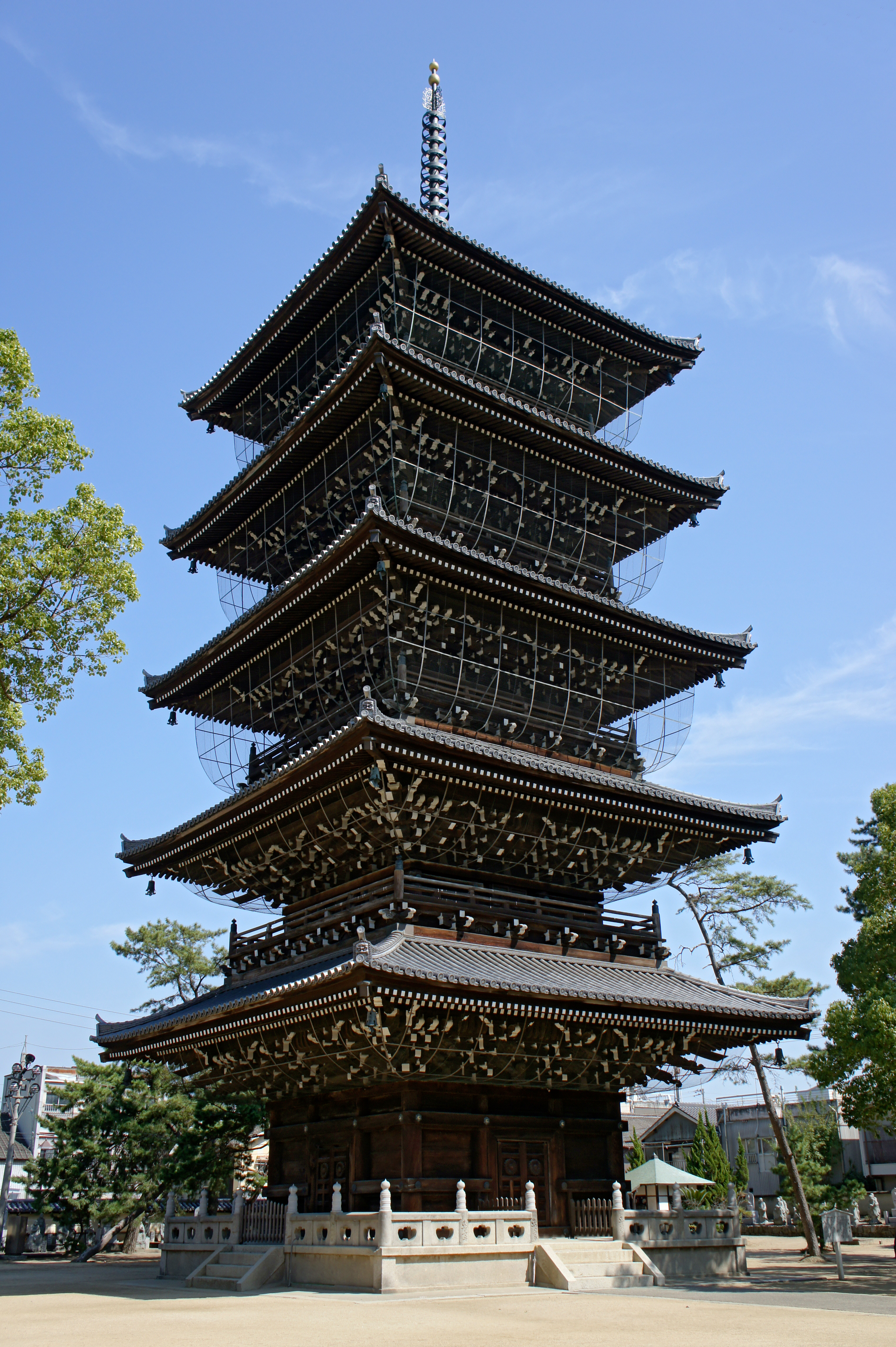
Zentsu-ji's five-tiered pagoda (gojū-no-tō)

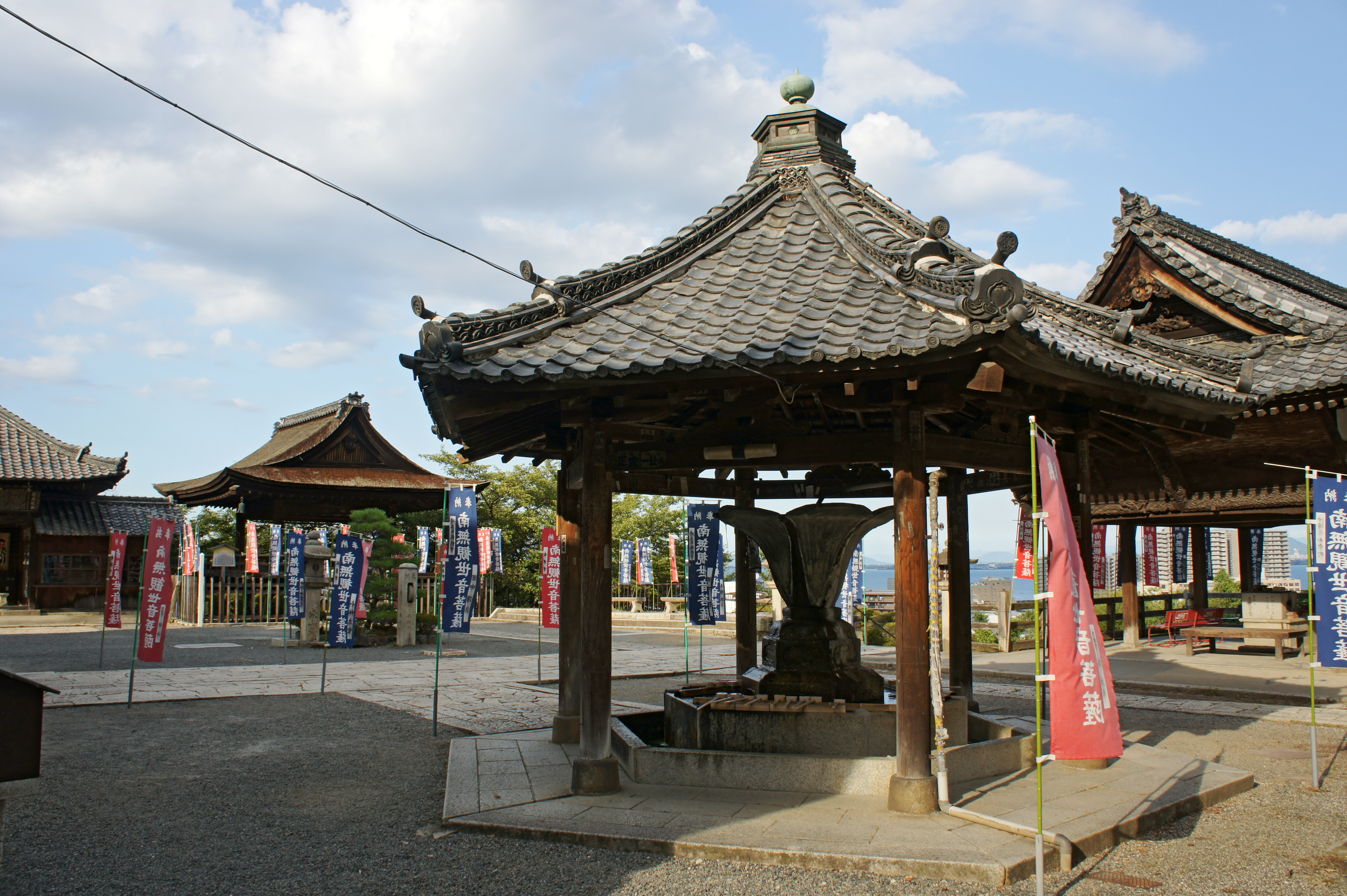
Mii-dera's temizuya

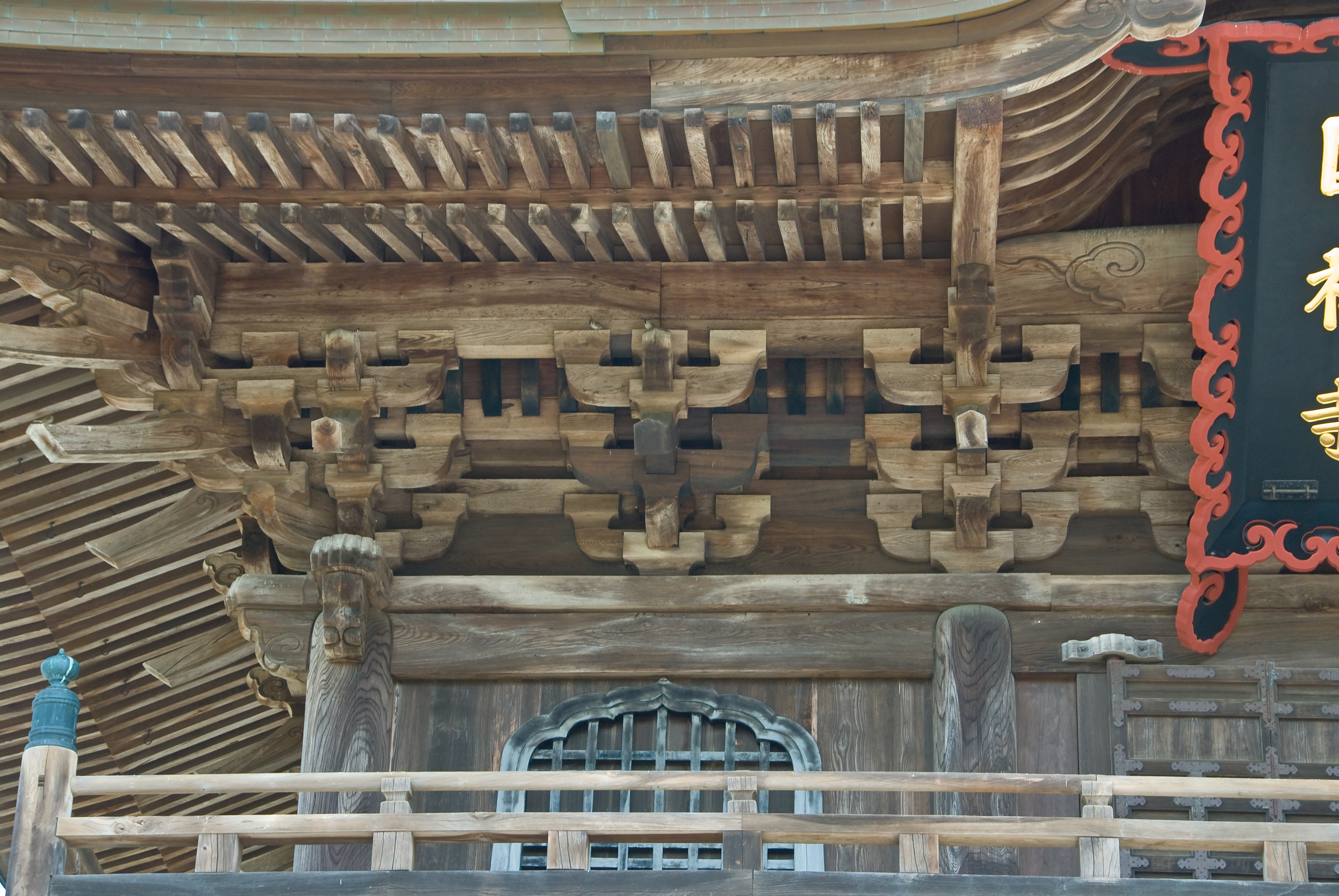
Brackets (tokyō, futatesaki in this case) under the eaves of a sanmon's roof.

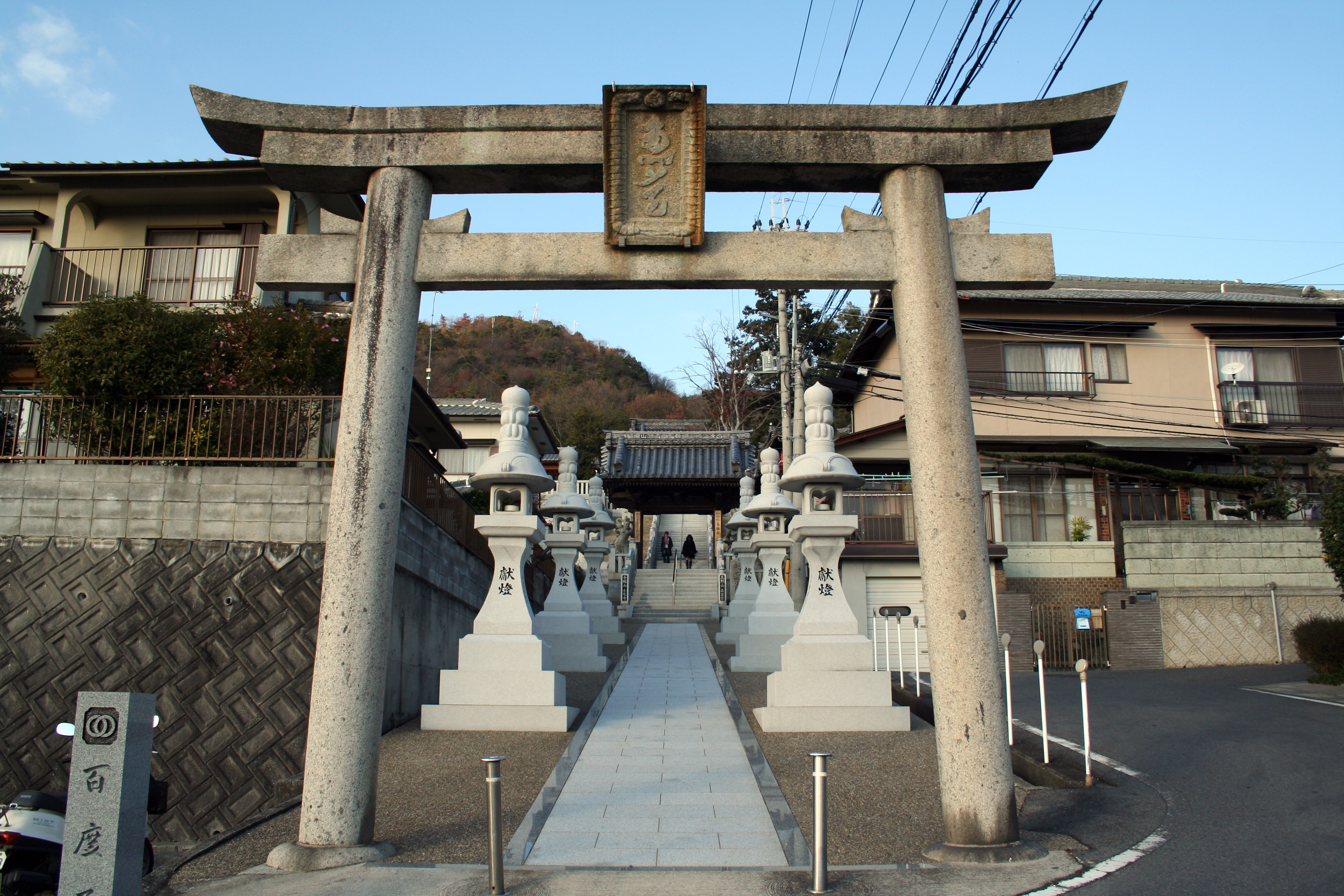
A torii on a temple's (Oyake-ji) sandō

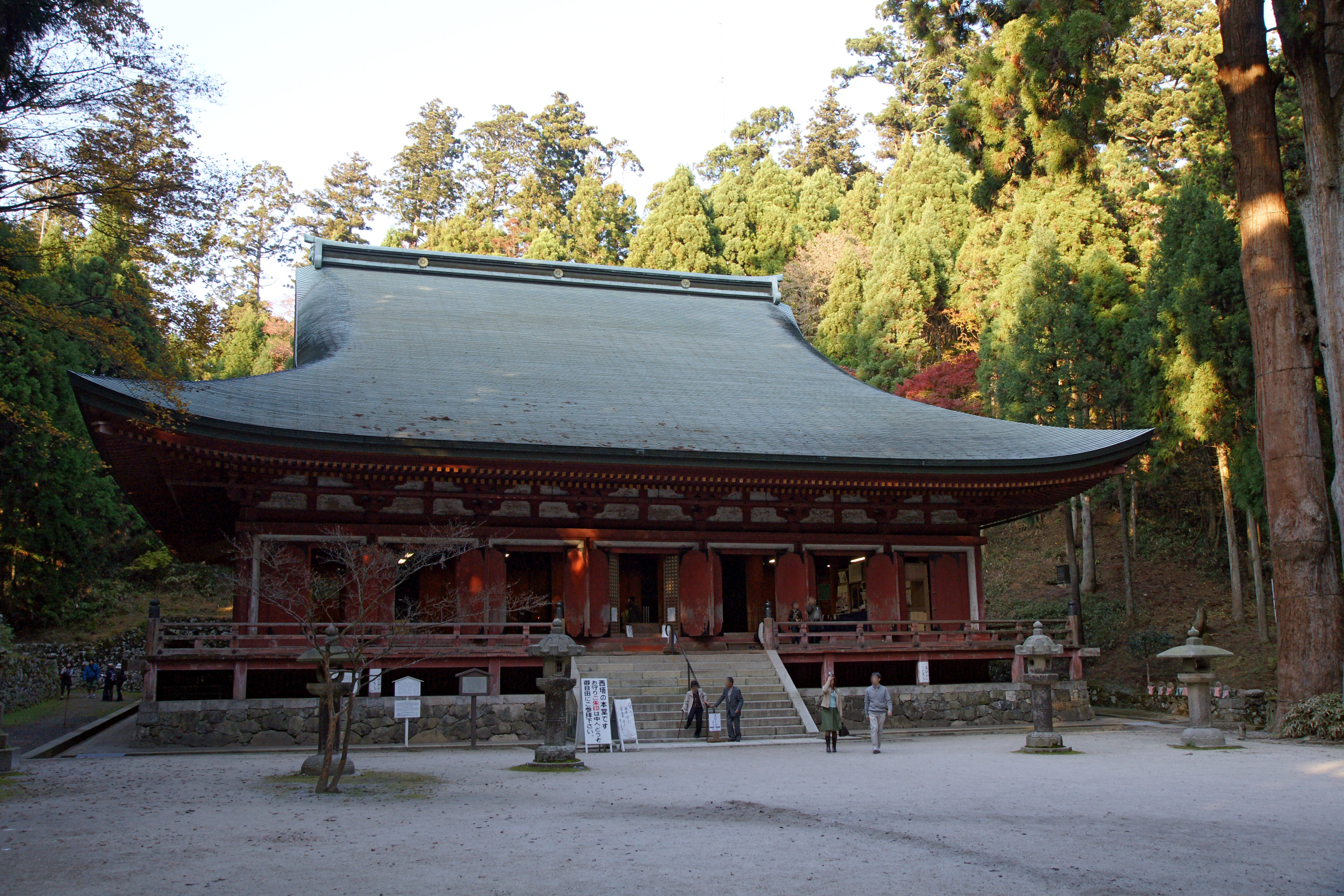
Enryaku-ji's shaka-dō

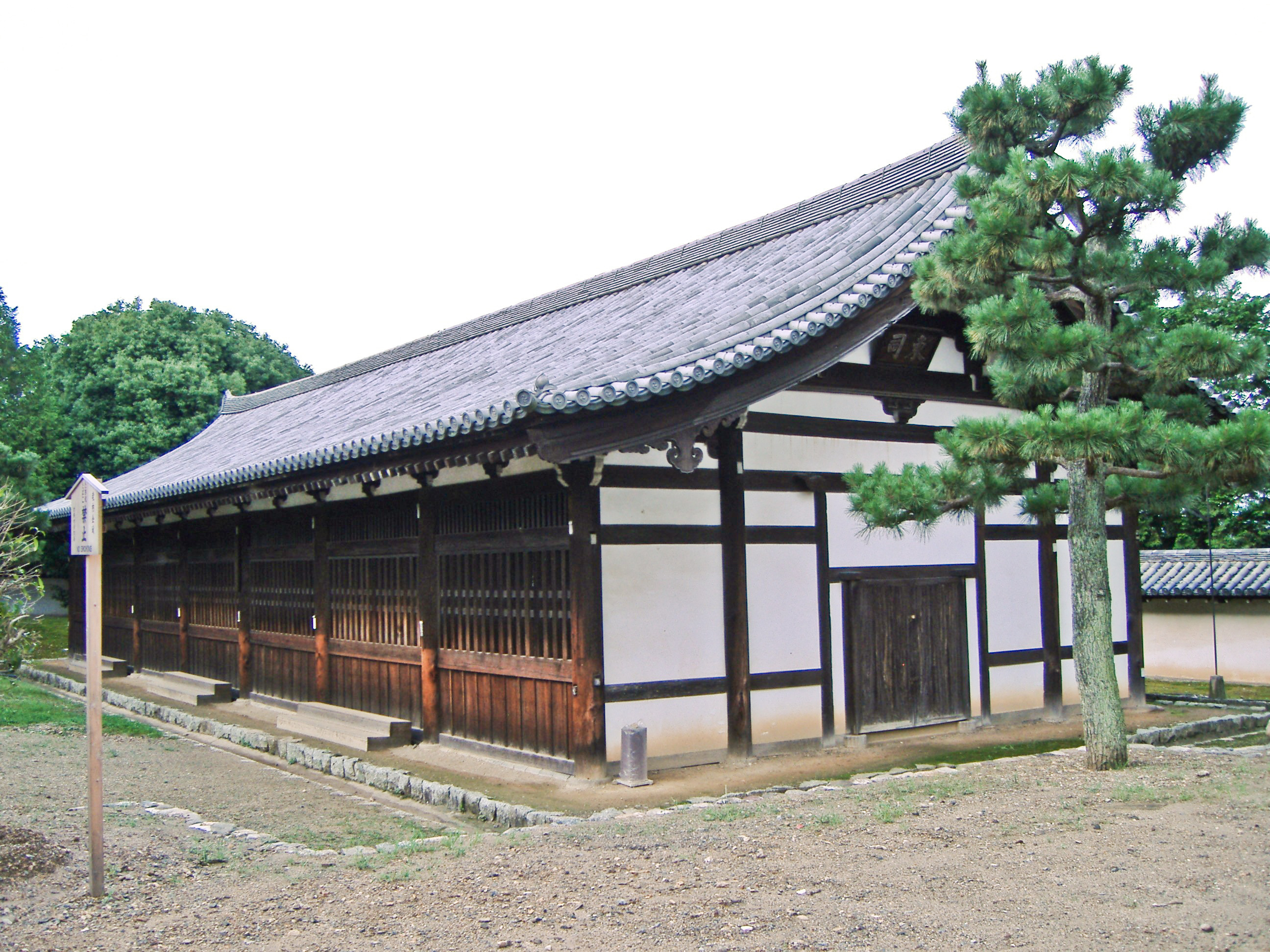
Tōufuku-ji's tōsu

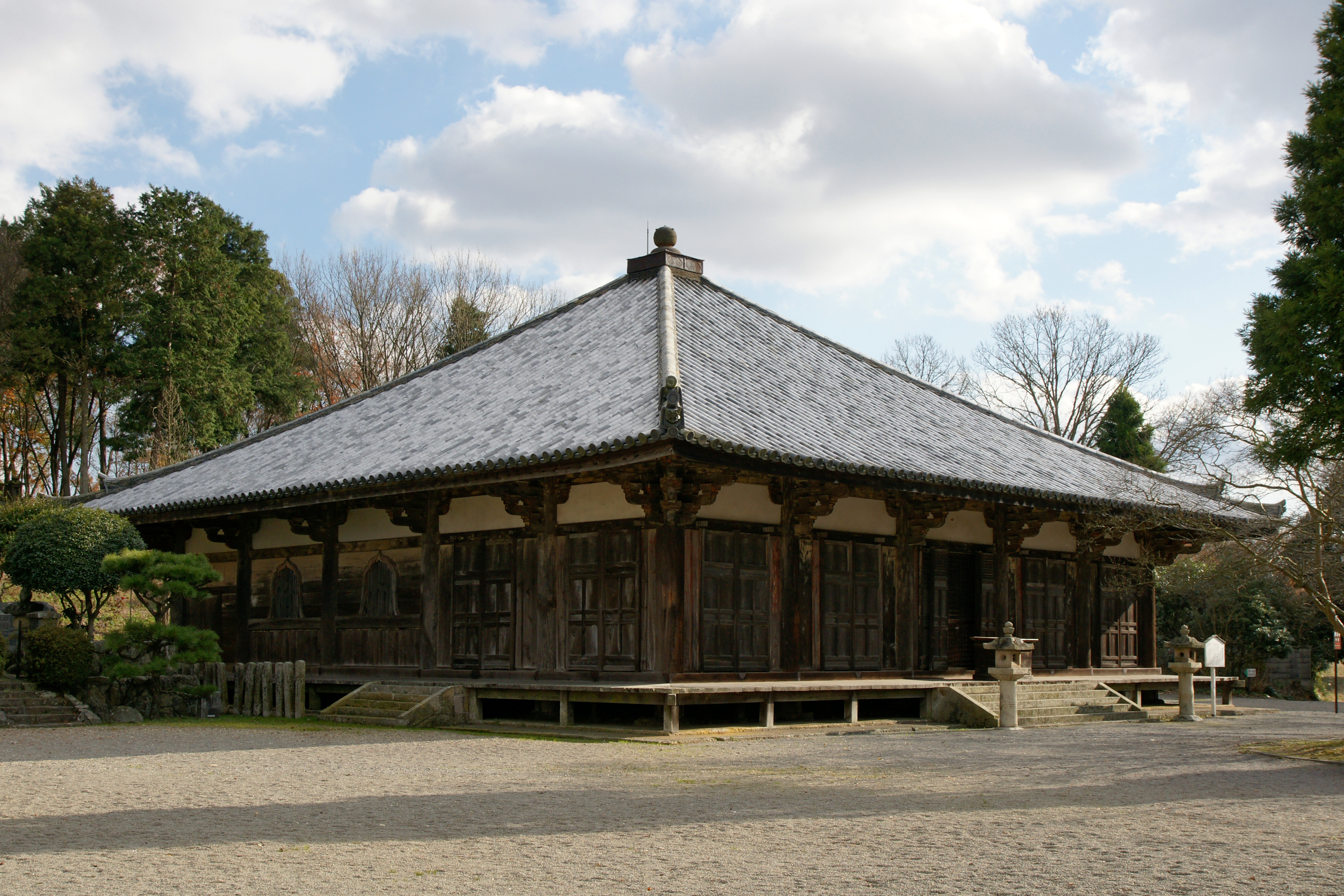
Jōdo-ji's yakushi-dō

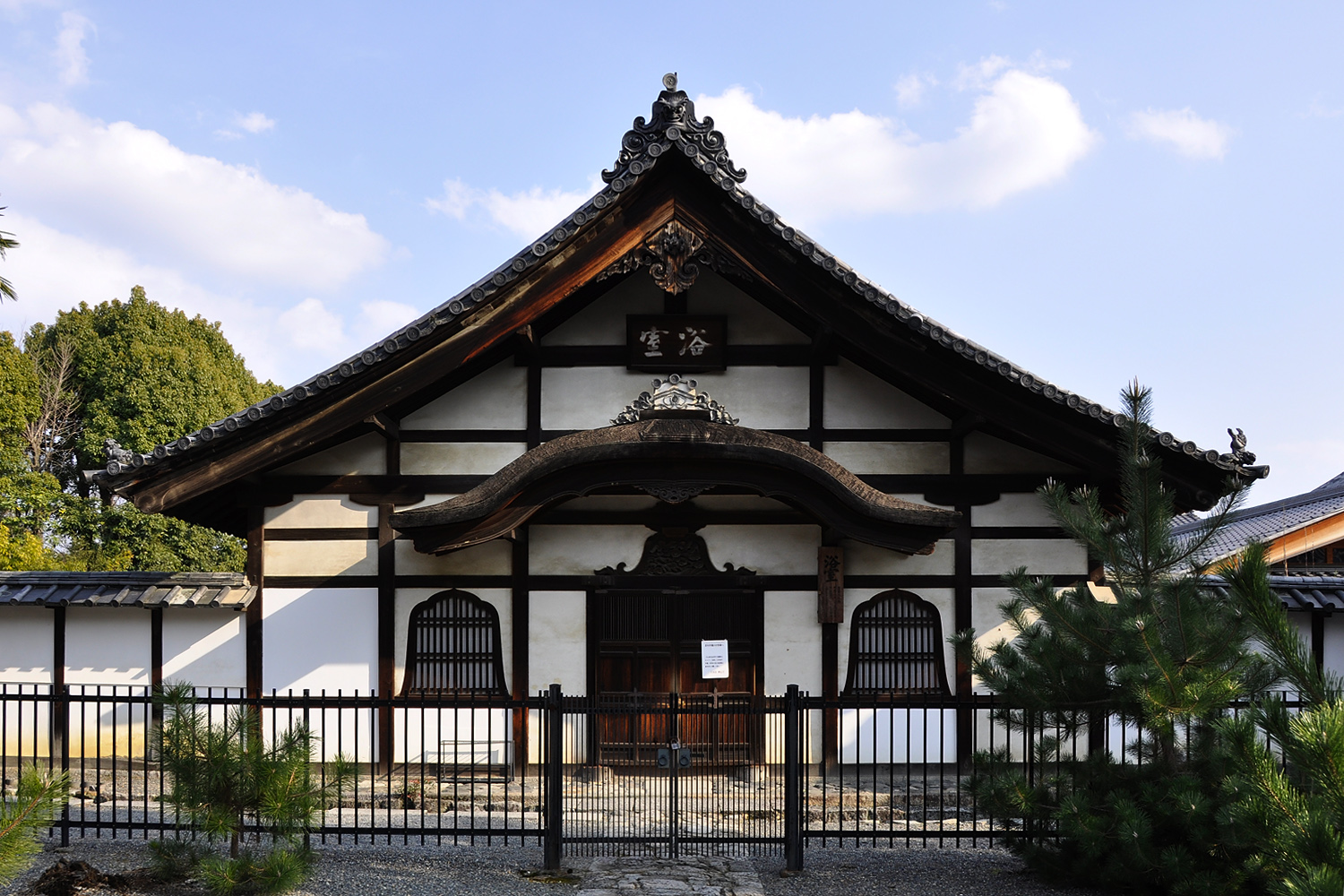
Myōshin-ji's yokushitsu (the temple's baths)

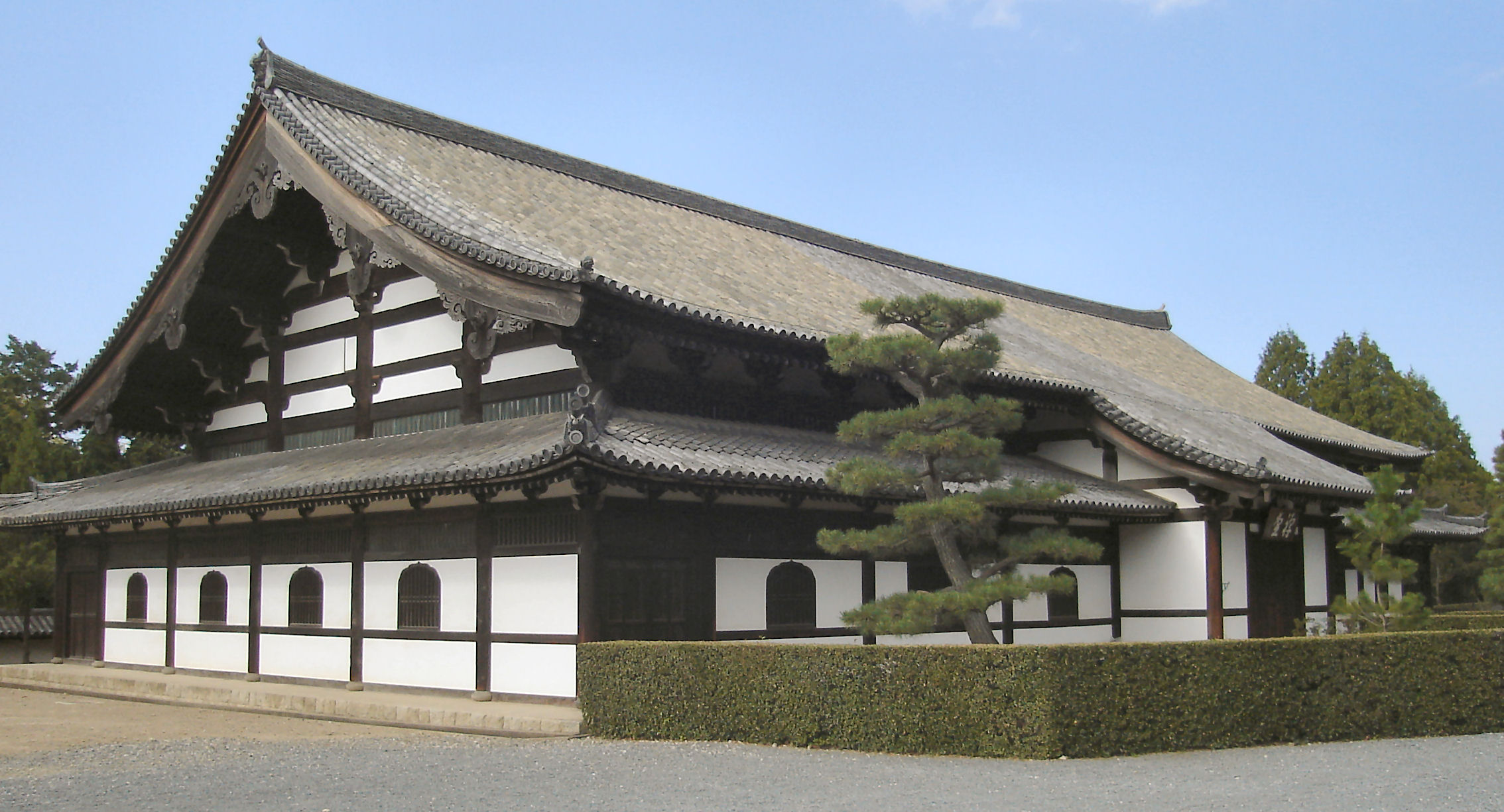
Tōfuku-ji's zen-dō

== See also ==
- Buddhist temples in Japan
- Glossary of Japanese Buddhism
- Haibutsu kishaku
- Japanese architecture
- List of National Treasures of Japan (temples)
