= Tokyō (architecture) =

Japanese architectural element

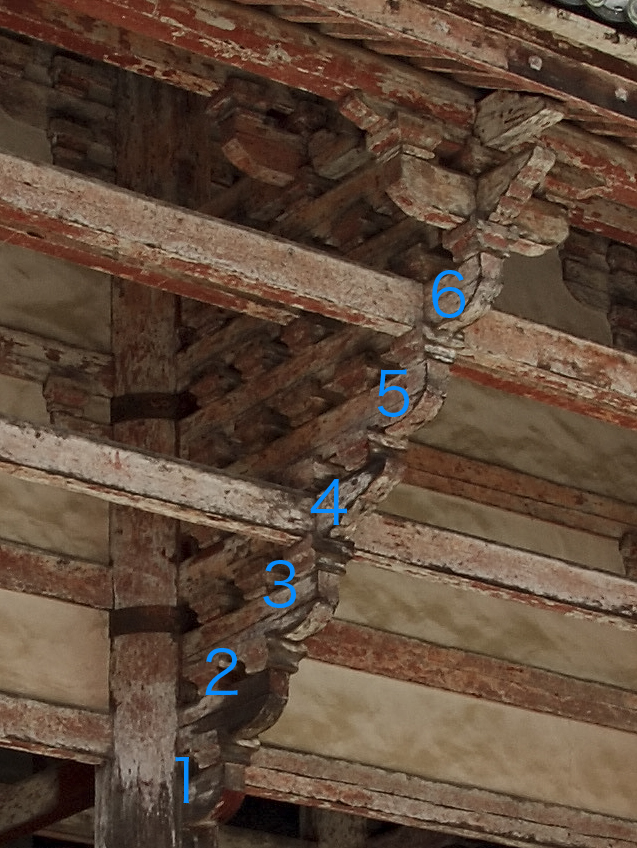
An example of mutesaki tokyō using six brackets

Tokyō (斗栱・斗拱; more often 斗きょう) (Note: Dougong (Chinese: 斗拱; pinyin: dǒugǒng) in Chinese) (also called kumimono (組物) or masugumi (斗組)) is a system of supporting blocks (斗 or 大斗, masu or daito; lit. block or big block) and brackets (肘木, hijiki; lit. elbow wood) supporting the eaves of a Japanese building, usually part of a Buddhist temple or Shinto shrine. The use of tokyō is made necessary by the extent to which the eaves protrude, a functionally essential element of Japanese Buddhist architecture. The system also has an important decorative function. The system is a localized form of the Chinese dougong that has evolved since its arrival into several original forms.

In its simplest configuration, the bracket system has a single projecting bracket and a single block, and is called hitotesaki. If the first bracket and block group support a second similar one, the whole system is called futatesaki, if three brackets are present it is called mitesaki, and so on until a maximum of six brackets as in the photo to the right.

Each supporting block in most cases supports, besides the next bracket, a U-shaped supporting bracket set at 90° to the first.

== Function and structure ==
Illustration of a mitesaki, three-stepped bracket used in Japanese traditional architecture

The roof is the most visually impressive part of a Buddhist temple, often constituting half the size of the whole edifice. The slightly curved eaves extend far beyond the walls, covering verandas. Besides being determinant to the general look of the edifice, the oversize eaves give its interior a characteristic dimness, a factor which contributes to the temple's atmosphere. Finally, the eaves have a practical function in a country where rain is a common event, because they protect the building by carrying the rain as far as possible from its walls. The roof's weight must however be supported by complex bracket systems called tokyō. The further the eaves extend, the greater and more complex must the tokyō be. An added benefit of the tokyō system is its inherent elasticity, which lessens the impact of an earthquake by acting as a shock absorber.

This bracketing system, being essential both structurally and esthetically, has been altered and refined many times since it was imported from China. It is made of a combination of weight bearing blocks (masu) and bracket arms (hijiki). The bearing block, when set directly on a post, is called daito, or "large block". When it connects two brackets, it is instead called makito (巻斗). Bearing blocks installed on top of corner posts are of necessity more complex and are called onito (鬼斗, demon blocks) because of how difficult they are to make. In its simplest configuration, each tokyō includes a single outwardly-projecting bracket with a single supporting block, in which case the complex is called hitotesaki (一手先; lit. 'one fingertip'). The projecting bracket is just the tip of one of the roof's beams. If the first bracket and block group supports a second similar one, the whole complex is called (futatesaki (二手先; lit. 'two fingertips')). The tokyō may also have three (mitesaki (三手先; lit. 'three fingertips')) or more such steps, up to six (mutesaki (六手先; lit. 'six fingertips'). The number of steps used to indicate the rank of a butsudō, the higher ranks having more, but the custom was abandoned after the Heian period. In most cases, besides the projecting bracket above it, a bearing block supports another bracket set at 90° (see schematic photo below), extending laterally the support provided by the system.

Wayō-, Zenshūyō- and Daibutsuyō-style tokyō all differ in details, the first being the simplest of the three. The Daibutsuyō style has for example a dish-shaped decoration called sarato (皿斗; lit. 'dish block') under each block, while the Zen'yō rounds up in an arc the bracket's lower ends. Another Zenshūyō feature is the kobushibana (拳鼻; lit. 'fist nose') or kibana (木鼻; lit. 'wooden nose'), a nose-like decoration carved after the last protruding bracket. (See photo in the gallery.) Some of these features can also be found in temples of non-Zen sects.

=== Notable types ===
==== Sumisonae ====
The sumisonae (隅備 or 隅具) or sumitokyō (隅斗きょう) are the brackets at the corner of a roof, having a particularly complex structure. The regular brackets between two sumisonae are called hirazonae (平備) or hiratokyou (平斗きょう).

==== Futatesaki ====
Very common two-step bracketing system used in a variety of structures. See in the gallery for example the photo of a belltower (shōrō).

==== Mitesaki ====
The three-step complex (mitesaki) is the most common in Wayō-style structures. Its third step is usually supported by a so-called tail rafter (尾垂木, odaruki), a cantilever set between the second and the third step (see illustration above and photo in the gallery).

==== Yotesaki ====
The four-step complex (四手先斗きょう, yotesaki tokyō) is used mainly in the top section of a tahōtō.

==== Mutesaki ====
The mutesaki tokyō (see photo above) is a six-step bracketing system whose most famous example can be seen at Today-ji's Namdaemun. In that gate's case, it consists of just six projecting brackets with no brackets at right angles (see photo above).

==== Kumo tokyō ====
The kumo tokyō (雲斗栱; lit. 'cloud tokyō') is the Japanese equivalent of dieji (疊枅) in early Chinese architecture. It is a bracket system where the projecting bracket is shaped in a way thought to resemble a cloud. It is rare in extant temples, and its most important examples are found in Hōryū-ji's Kondō, five-storied pagoda and Chūmon. These bracket systems are believed to be a Japanese invention of the Asuka period, as there is no evidence they came from the Continent.

==== Sashihijiki ====
The sashihijiki (挿肘木) is the Japanese equivalent of chagong in Chinese architecture. It is a bracket arm inserted directly into a pillar instead of resting onto a supporting block on top of a pillar, as was normal in the wayō style. Typical of the Daibutsuyō style, these brackets are clearly visible in the photo at the top of the article.

=== Tsumegumi ===
Tsumegumi (詰組) are intercolumnar supporting brackets, usually futatesaki or mitesaki, installed one immediately after the other. The result is an extremely compact row of brackets. Tsumegumi are typical of the Zenshūyō style, which arrived to Japan with Zen Buddhism at the end of the 12th century.

== Gallery ==
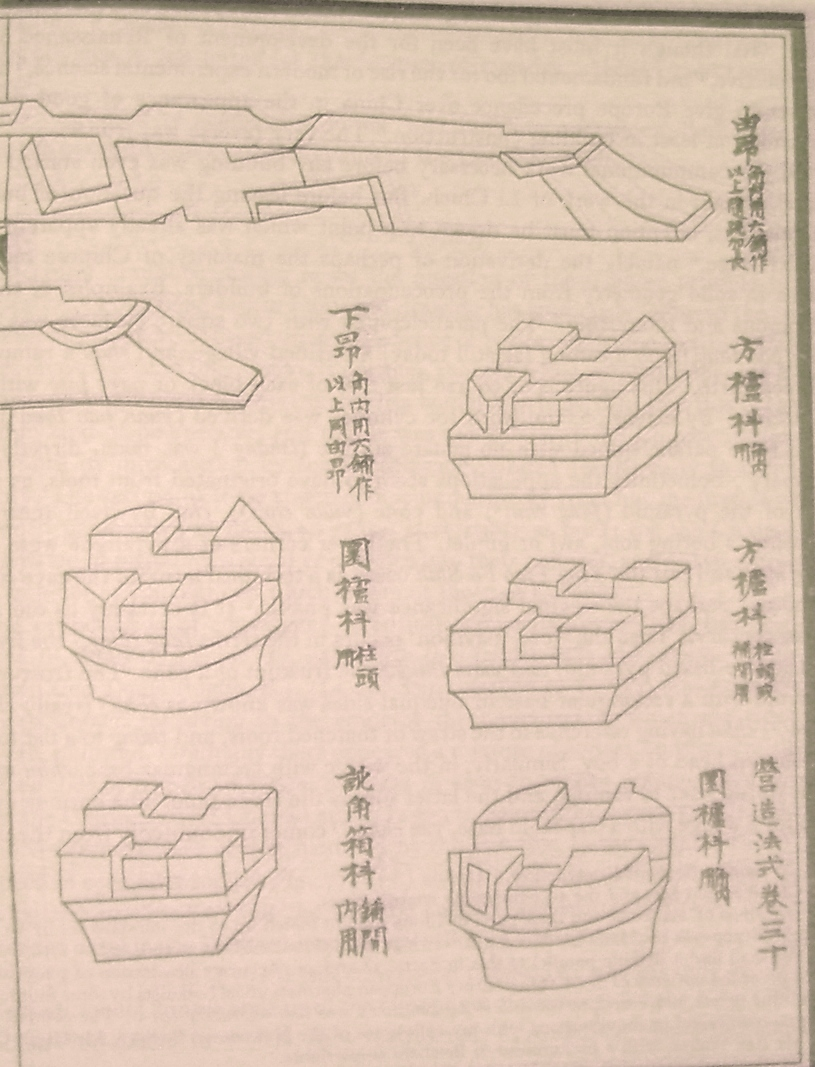
Diagram of bracket and cantilever arms from the building manual Yingzao Fashi (published in 1103) of the Song dynasty

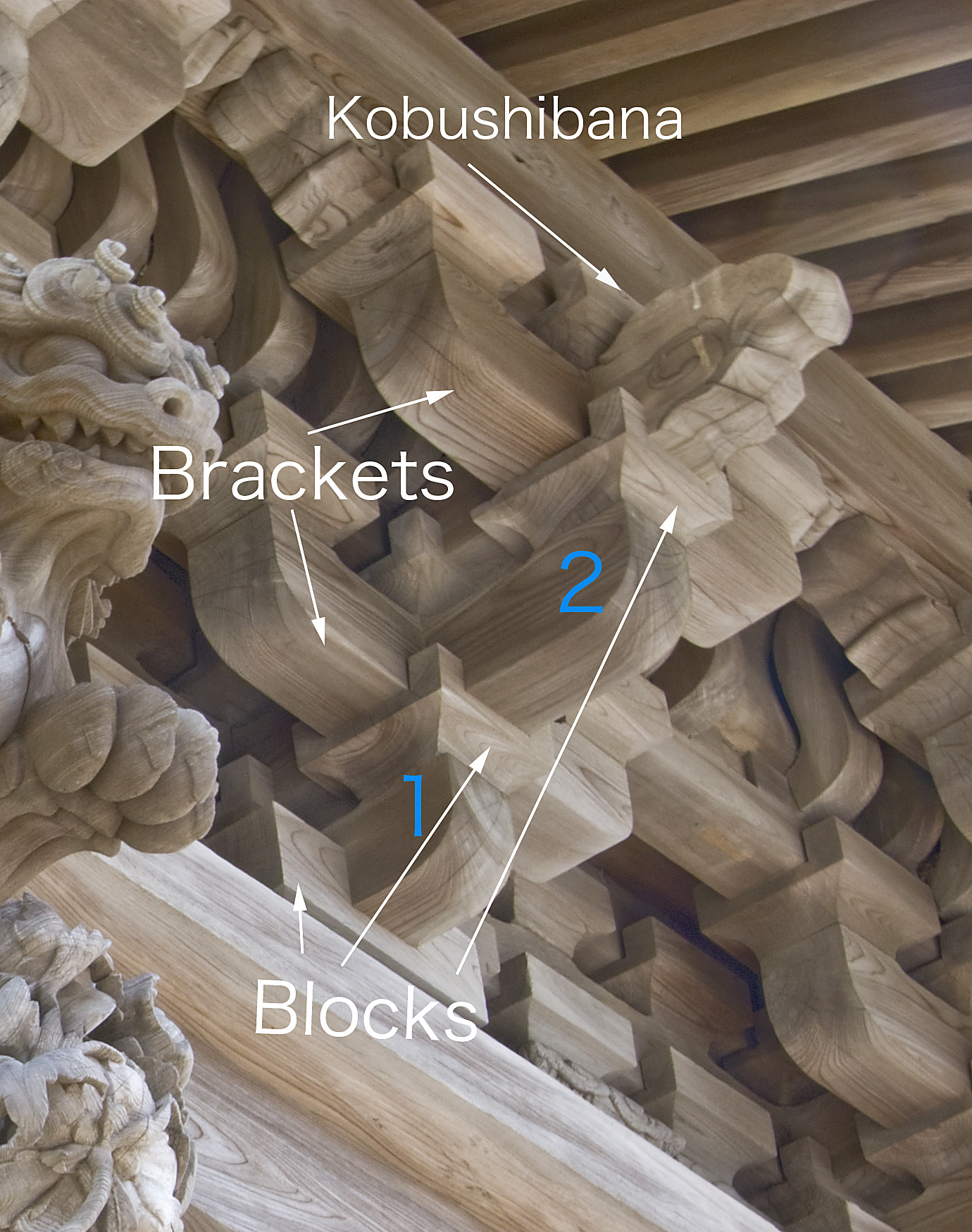
Tokyō components (block, bracket, kobushibana/kibana)

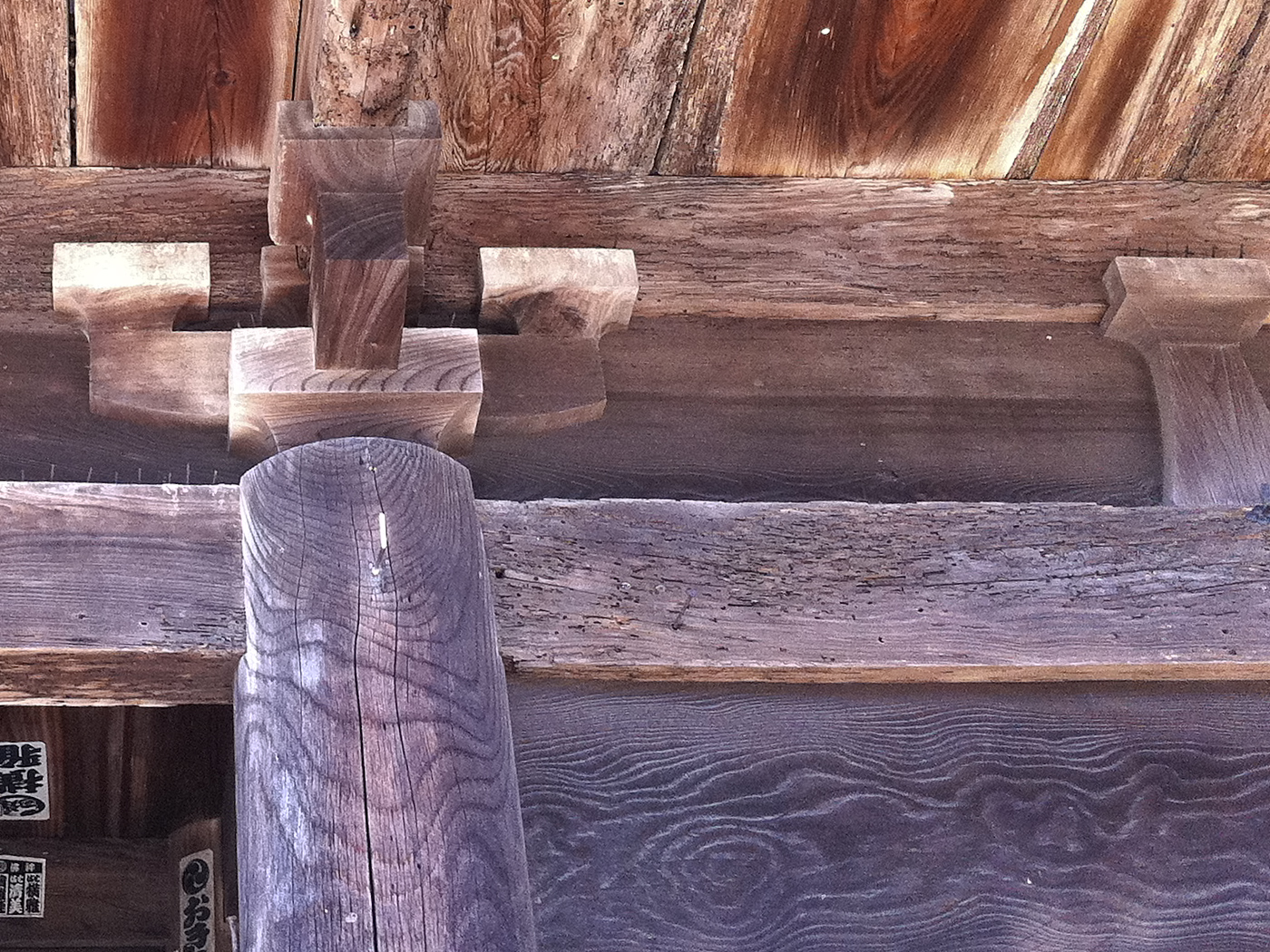
Hitotesaki tokyō, rōmon, Honkaku-ji, Kamakura

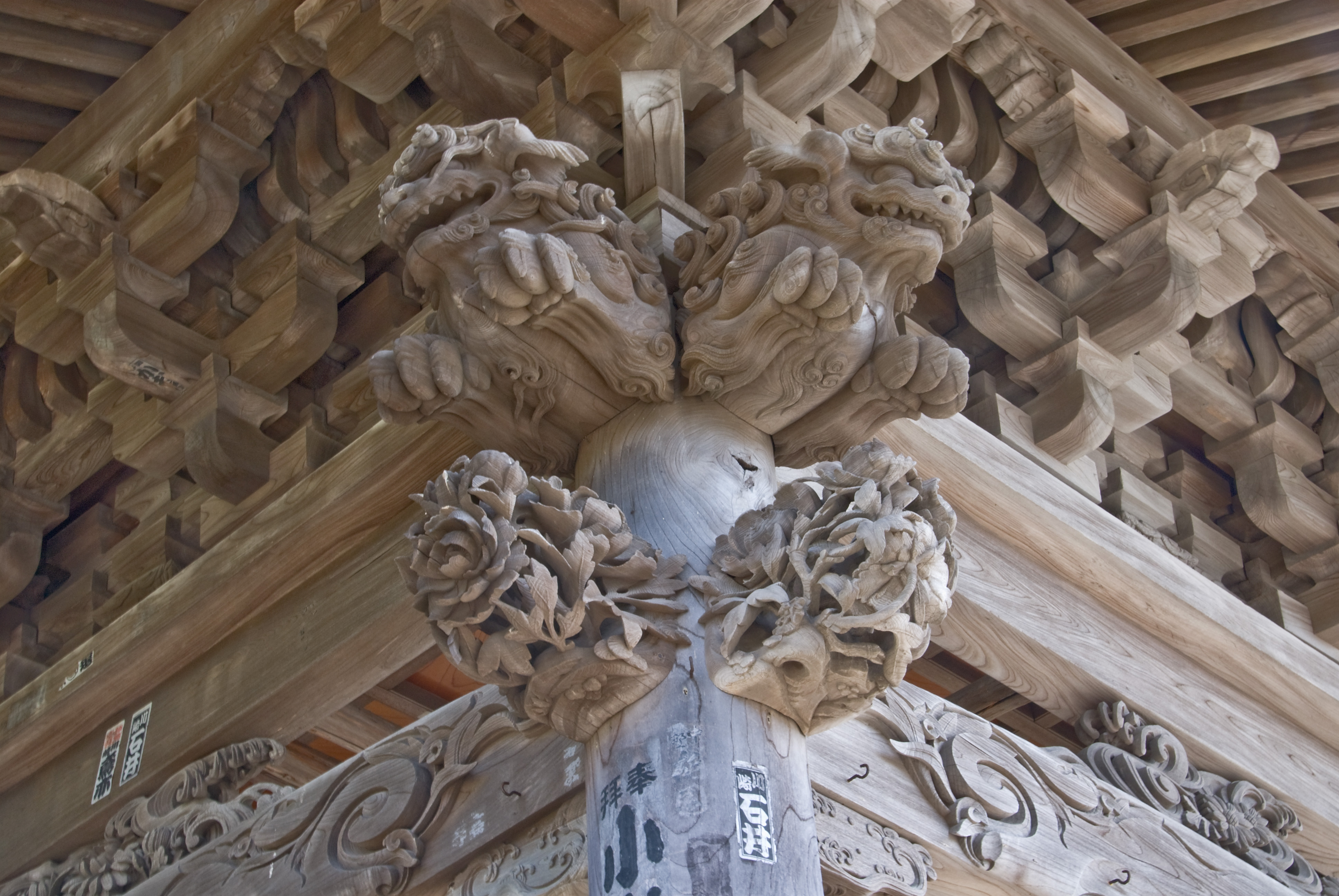
Futatesaki tokyō, Kōmyō-ji, Kamakura

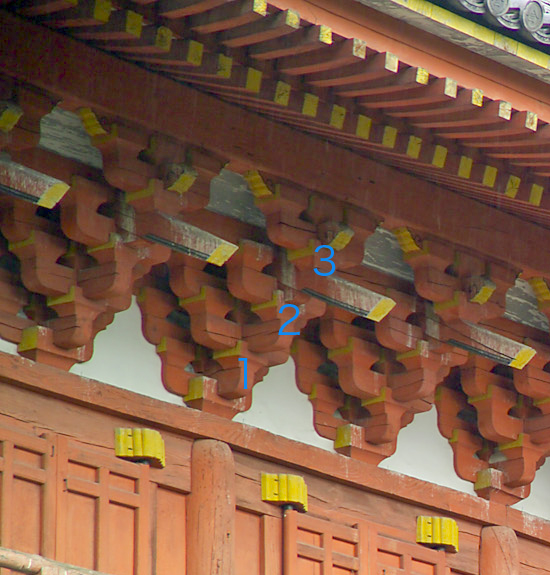
Mitesaki tokyō, Daitoku-ji, Kyoto. Note the tail rafters.

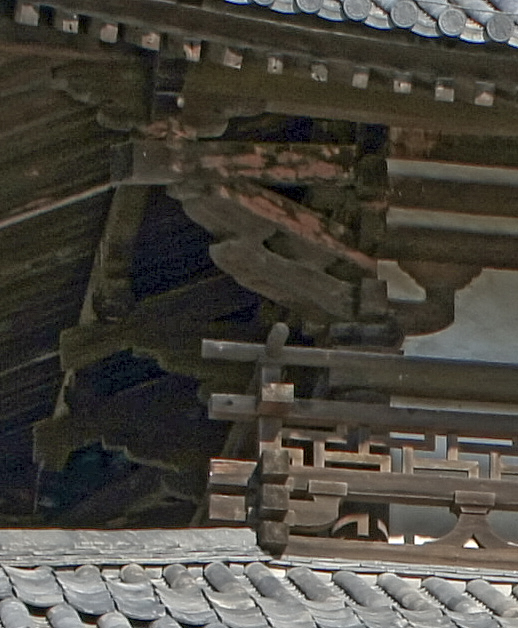
Kumo tokyō, Hōryū-ji, Chūmon

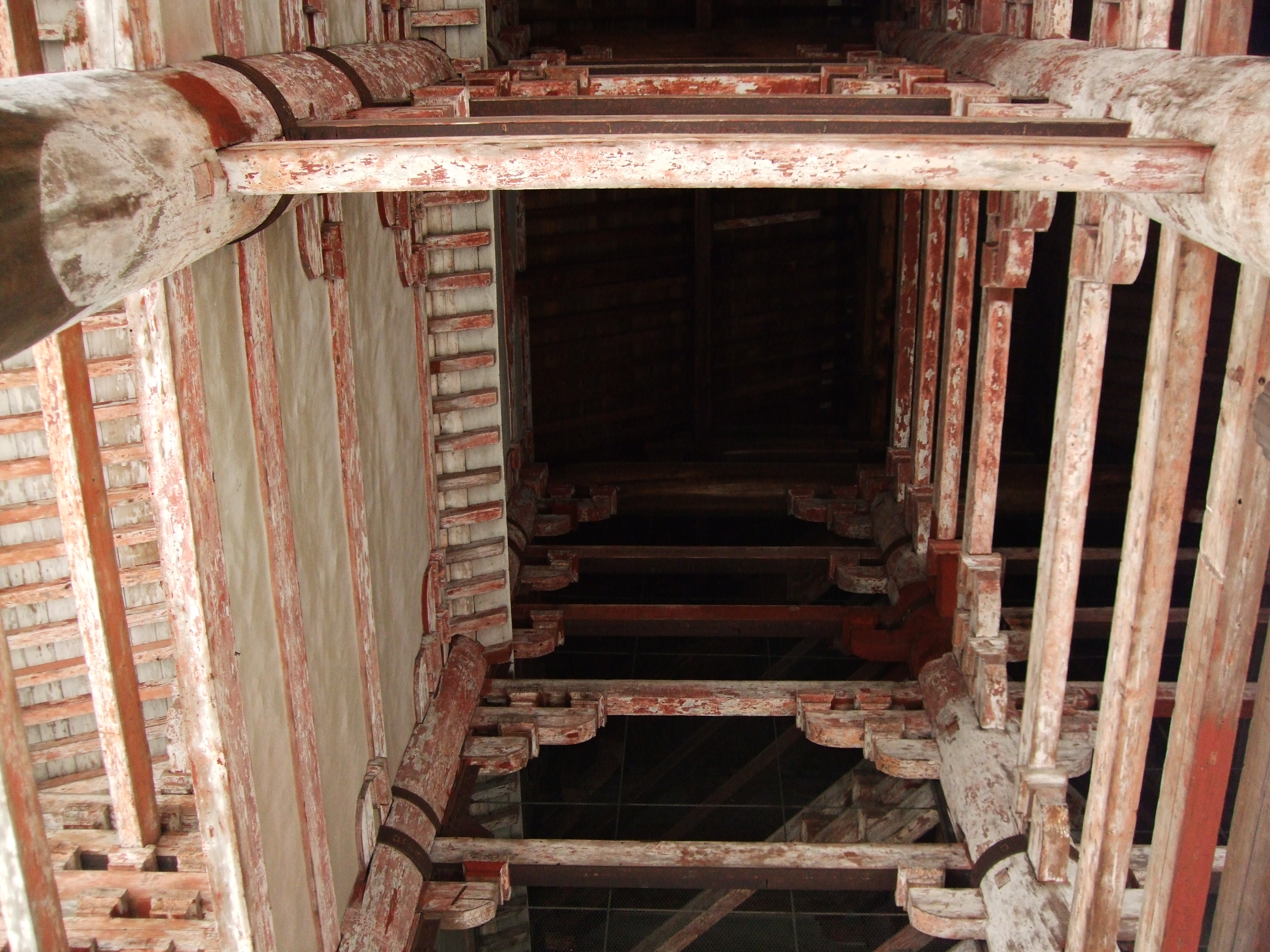
Interior of Tōdai-ji's Nandaimon. Visible the beams connecting to the tokyō

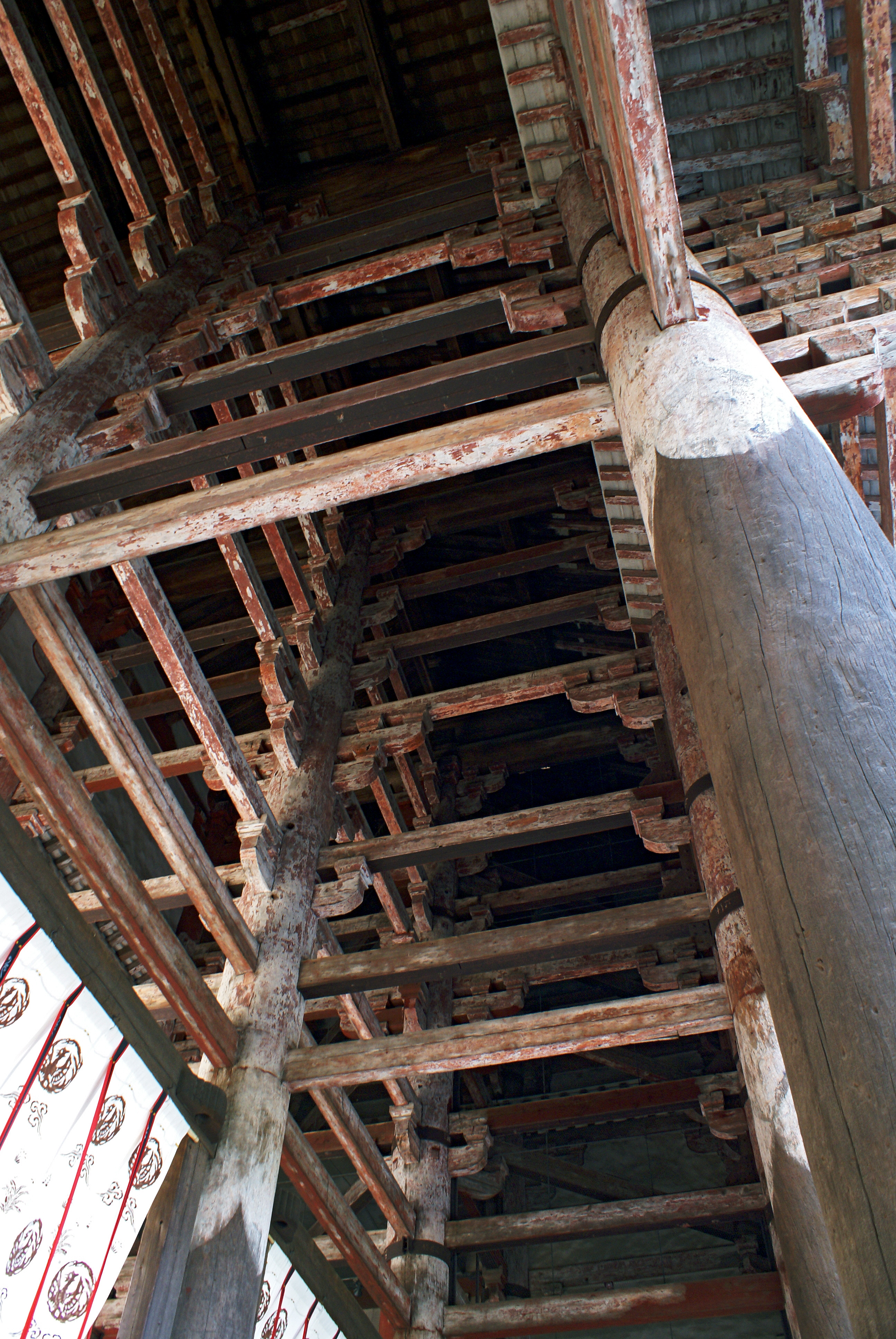
Interior of Tōdai-ji's Nandaimon. Visible the beams connecting to the tokyō

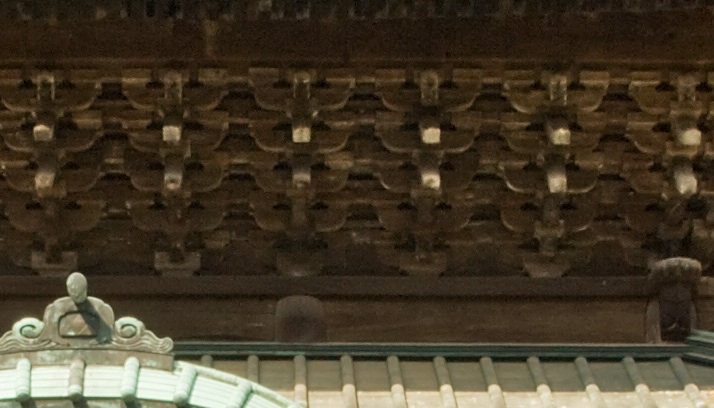
Tsumegumi (Butsuden, Kenchō-ji)

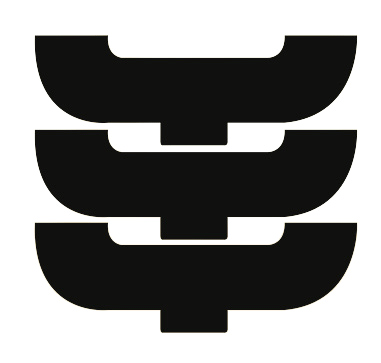
The Protection of Cultural Properties logo represents a tokyō
