= Zenshūyō =

Japanese Buddhist architectural style

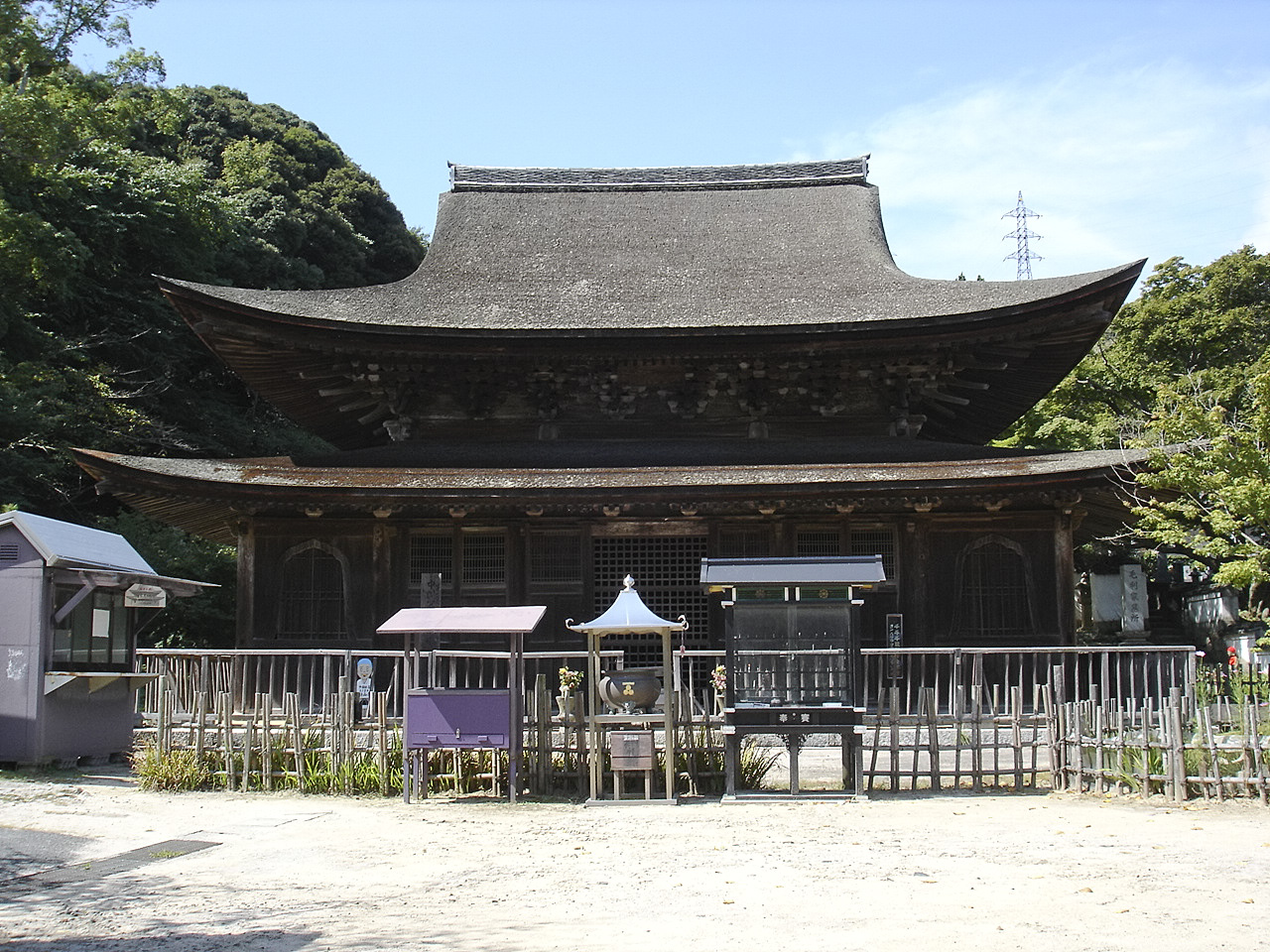
Kōzan-ji's butsuden in Shimonoseki

Zenshūyō' (禅宗様; "Zen style") is a Japanese Buddhist architectural style derived from Chinese Song Dynasty architecture. Named after the Zen sect of Buddhism which brought it to Japan, it emerged in the late 12th or early 13th century. Together with Wayō and Daibutsuyō, it is one of the three most significant styles developed by Japanese Buddhism on the basis of Chinese models. Until World War II, this style was called karayō (唐様, Chinese style) but, like the Daibutsuyō style, it was re-christened by Ōta Hirotarō, a 20th-century scholar. Its most typical features are a more or less linear layout of the garan, paneled doors hanging from hinges, intercolumnar tokyō, cusped windows, tail rafters, ornaments called kibana, and decorative pent roofs.

Kōzan-ji's butsuden in Shimonoseki, Zenpuku-in's shaka-dō in Kainan, Wakayama and Anraku-ji's pagoda in Ueda, Nagano, all dating to the Kamakura period, are considered the three most important Zenshūyō buildings. Kōzan-ji's butsuden (built in 1320) is the oldest extant building in the Zenshūyō style in Japan.

== History ==
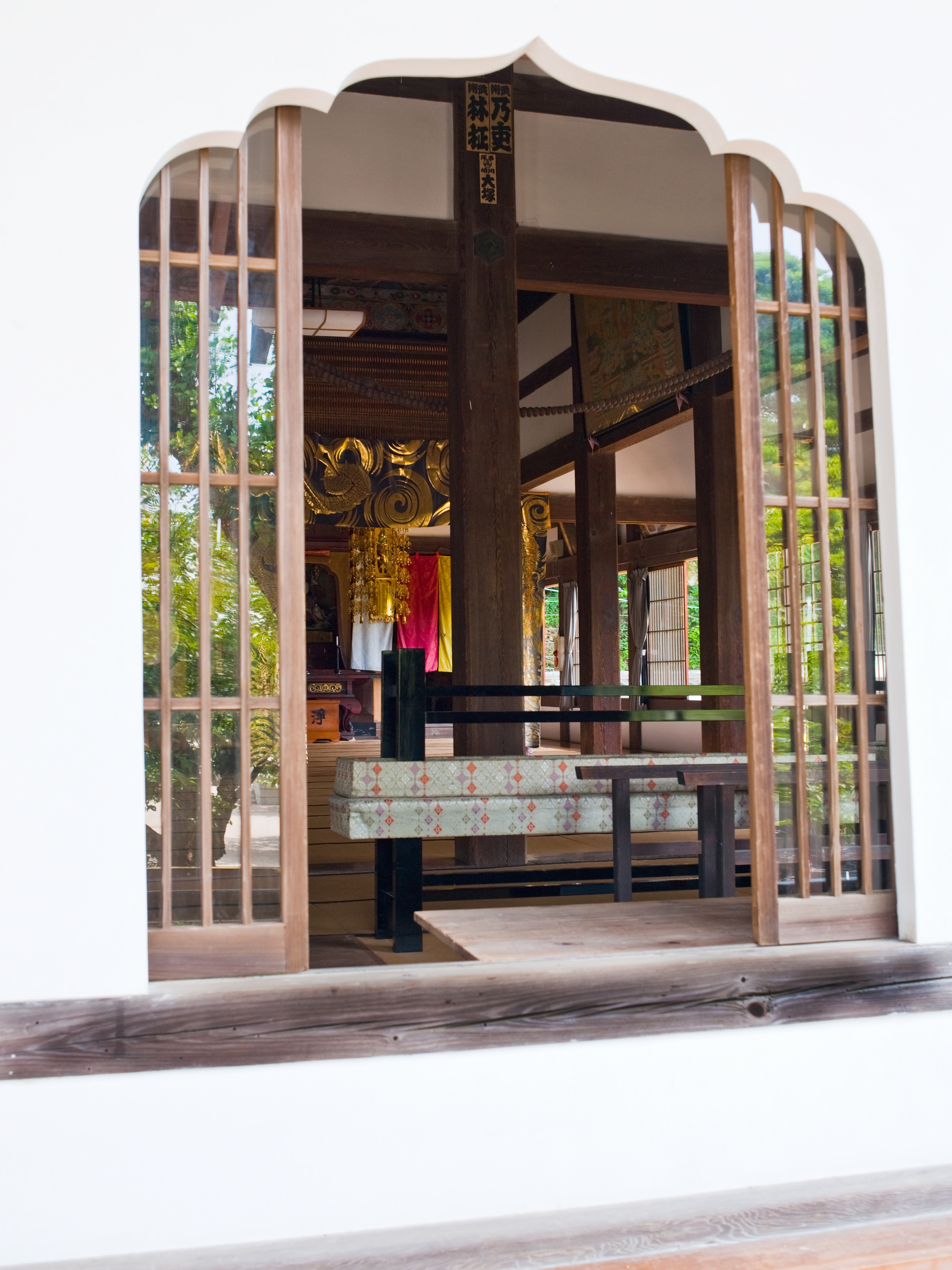
A Zen cusped window

At the end of the 12th century, more or less while in Nara Chōgen was rebuilding Tōdai-ji, and in the process was creating the architectural style that would later be called Daibutsuyō, two monks were introducing Zen to Japan. First was Eisai, who brought the Rinzai school teachings to Kamakura. Having the support of shōgun Minamoto no Yoriie, he was able to found temples in both Kamakura and Kyoto.

A little later, Dōgen introduced the Sōtō school to Japan. Unlike Eisai, he declined the support of Kamakura's regent Hōjō Tokiyori and open his head temple, Eihei-ji, within the forests of today's Fukui prefecture. The success of the Zen sects, which were embraced by the warrior caste, meant that they were able to introduce to the country also a new architectural style, like the Daibutsuyō derived from Song Dynasty architecture, but very different in spirit.

After arriving in Japan the style started to evolve in response to local conditions and tastes. Among its innovations is the roof, covered in wood shingles rather than tiles, as in China. Also, Zen temple buildings have a so-called "hidden roof" structure, consisting in two roofs, the true one and a second underneath it. The second, false roof hides the first, making it possible to obtain sloping roofs and shallow eaves. The invention of the hidden roof in the 10th century allowed the inclination of the roof's underside to be completely different from that of the exterior, thus making Japanese temples feel very different from their Chinese counterparts.

== Characteristics ==
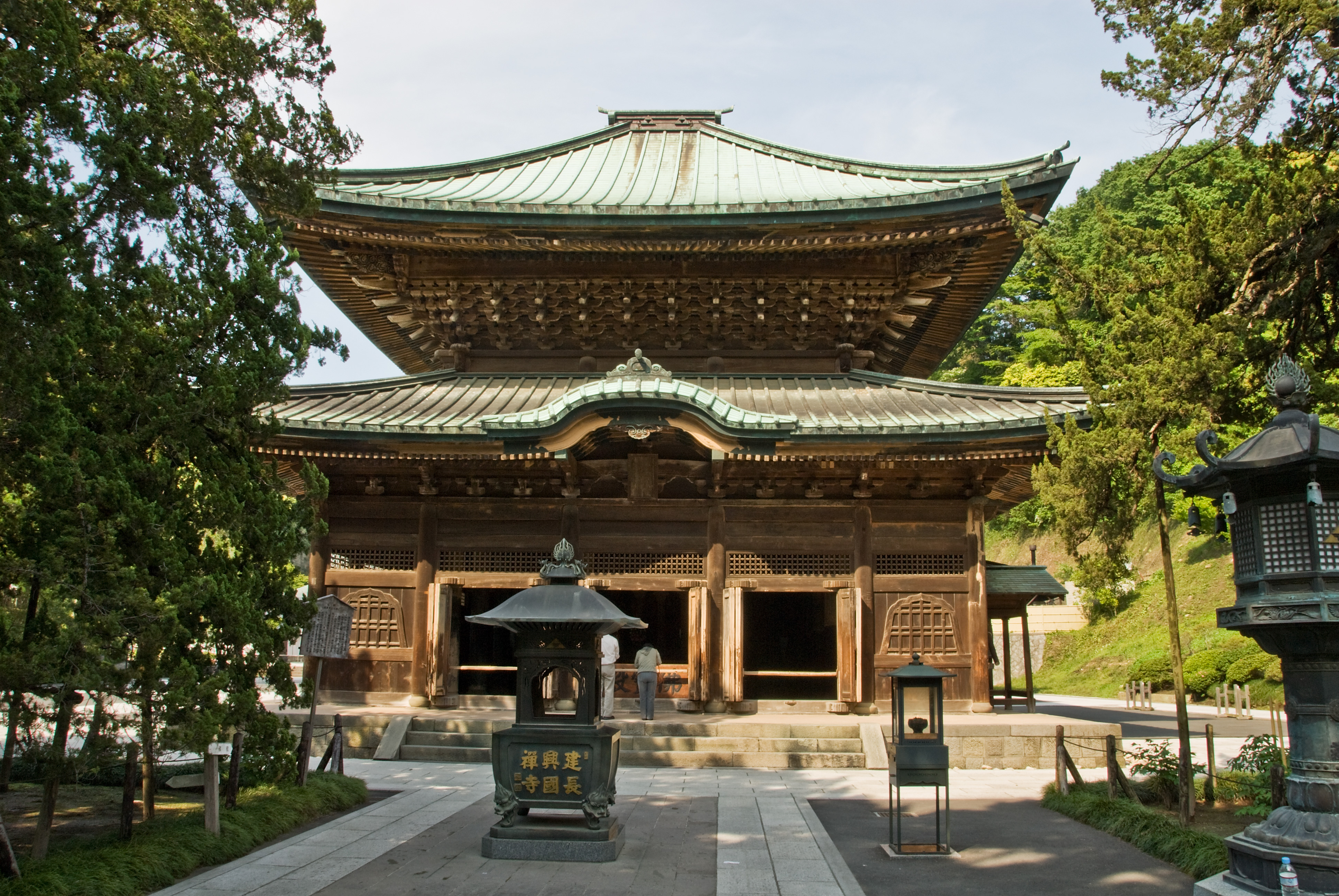
A typical Zen main hall

The Zen sect was very successful, and therefore often imitated. Many of its innovations were therefore widely adopted by other Buddhist schools. Zenshūyō's characteristics are decorative pent roofs (mokoshi) and pronouncedly curved main roofs, cusped windows (katōmado), earthen floors and paneled doors. Wood structures are relatively light, design light and orderly. All buildings are erected on stone podia and have either stone or earthen floors.

Other important characteristics are:

- More or less fixed garan composition and layout

Zen's discipline is strict and its rules many and complex. As a consequence, the Zen garan has a typical elongated and bilaterally symmetrical layout where each building's shape, position, scale and use are predetermined. To the contrary, older schools like Tendai and Shingon use more irregular building dispositions which take into account terrain characteristics. The typical Zen garan, of which Kenchō-ji's is a good example, begins with a gate followed by another, larger one (sanmon), the main hall (the butsuden), the lecture hall (hattō), and the chief abbot's residence (hōjō) all aligned more or less on a north to south axis, with the bath house (yokushitsu) and the sūtra repository (kyōzō) to its east, and the monks' hall (sodō) to its west.

- Use of penetrating tie beams

During the Heian period temples were built using only non-penetrating tie beams (nageshi (長押)) made to fit around columns and pillars, then nailed. The daibutsuyō style and the zenshūyō style replaced them with penetrating tie-beams (nuki (長押)), which actually pierced the column, and were therefore much more effective against earthquakes. The nageshi was however retained as a purely decorative element.

- Tokyō between posts

While other styles put roof-supporting brackets only above columns, Zen temples have them also between columns (see photo above).

- Tōrihijiki

Each bracket step has its own tōrihijiki or tōshihijiki (通り肘木), a long horizontal beam parallel to the wall and inserted into the bracket step. (See photo in the gallery.) It strengthens the structure while at the same time supporting the roof rafters.

- Odaruki

A tokyō's third step is usually supported by a so-called tail rafter (尾垂木, odaruki), a cantilever set between the second and the third step (see illustration in the gallery). The name refers to its typical shape, similar to a tail protruding from the bracket.

- Kibana

Another Zenshūyō feature is the kobushibana (拳鼻; lit. 'fist nose') or kibana (木鼻; lit. wooden nose), a nose-like decoration with a spiraling motif carved on a rafter after the last protruding bracket. (See photo in the gallery.)

- Fan-shaped roof rafters

Roof rafters radiate outwards from a single central point.

- Paneled doors

Doors called sankarado (桟唐戸) are made of separate panels and do not slide, but are fixed to the tie beams by heavy hinges called waraza (藁座). Above the door's panels runs a transom (architectural) which admits light through curved openings.

- Sōmon and sanmon

The entrance to a Zen temple is straddled by two symbolic gates, the sōmon and the more important sanmon.

- Mokoshi

Typical of the style is also the main hall (butsuden), which has just one story but seems to have two because of the presence of a roofed corridor called mokoshi. Having the width of one bay, it makes the three-bay, one-story building look like a two-storey, five-bay building.

- Cusped windows

Zen temples have typical bell-shaped windows called katōmado (火灯窓, fire light window). Originally the two sides were vertical, but they acquired a slant later on. Their use is now widespread, and they can be found even at Shinto shrines and castles.

- No pagoda

Because of the decline in the use of pagodas, like that of other younger schools the Zen garan usually does not have a pagoda.

== Gallery ==
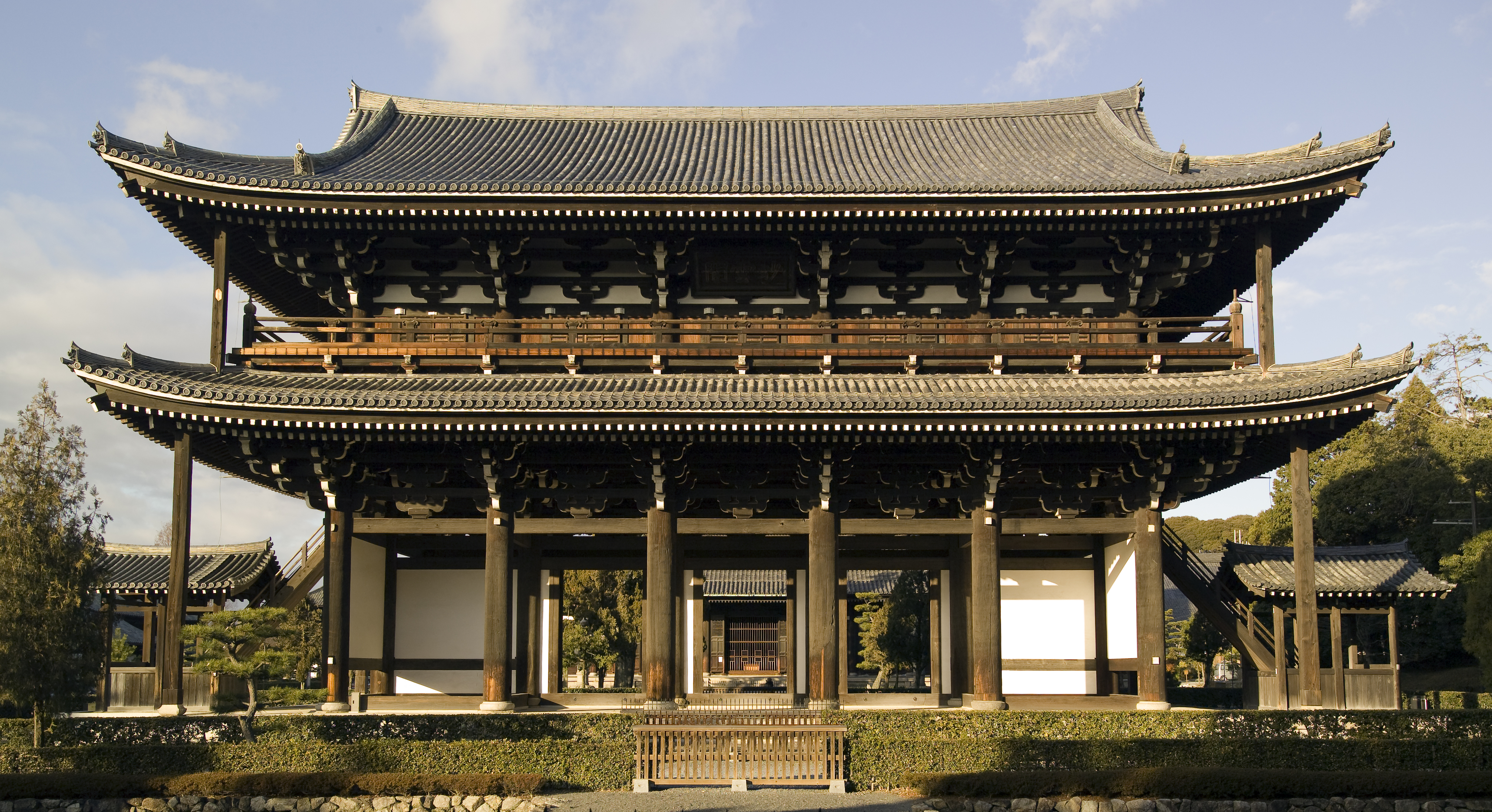
Zen sanmon (Tōfuku-ji)

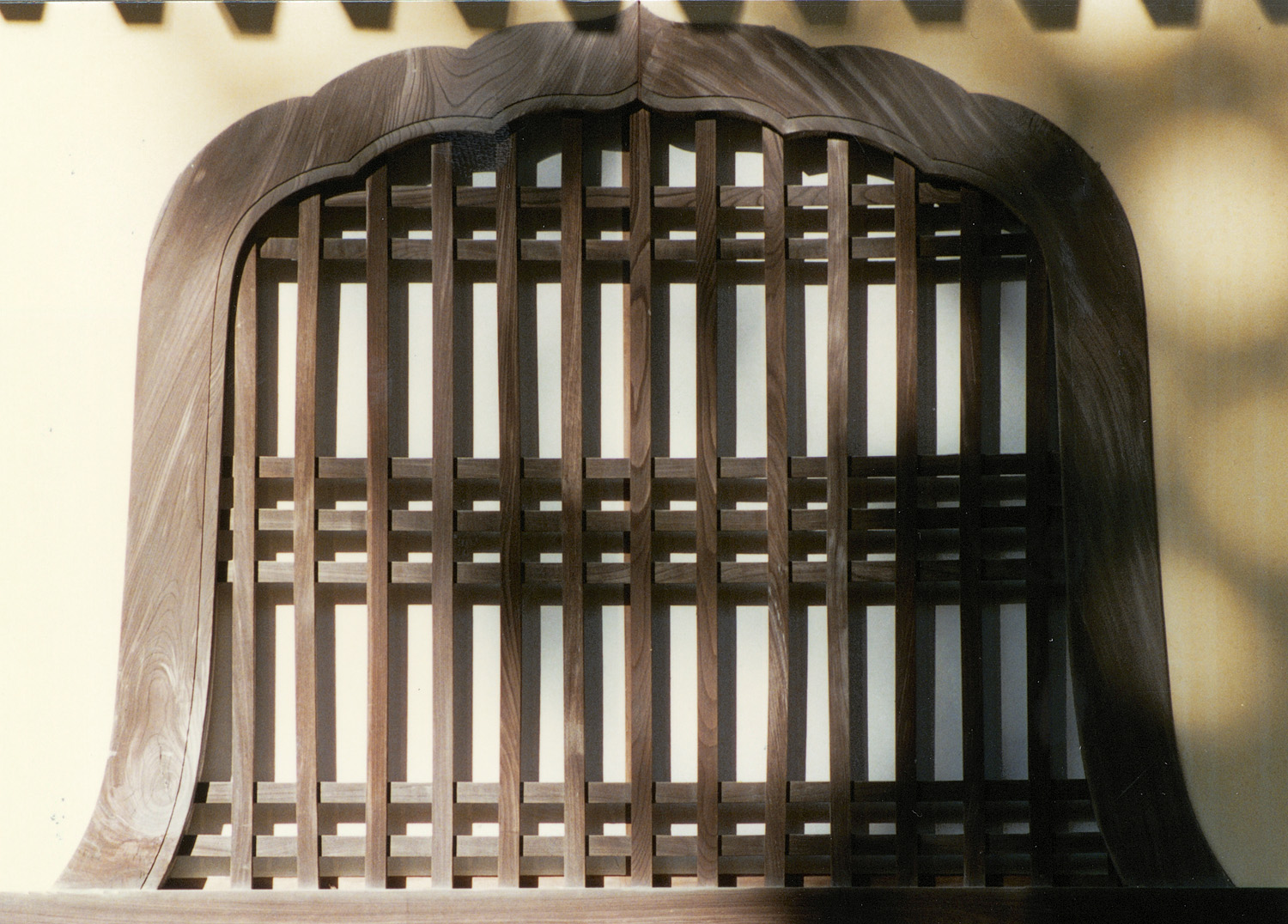
Katōmado (Nanzen-ji)

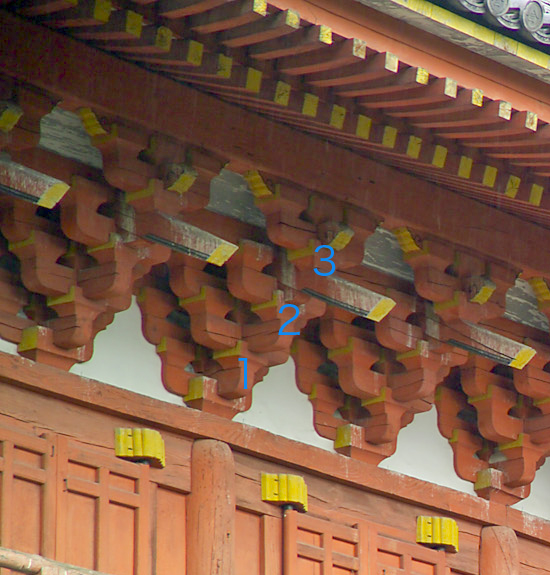
Intercolumnar tokyō, each of the three steps having a tōrihijiki (Daitoku-ji)

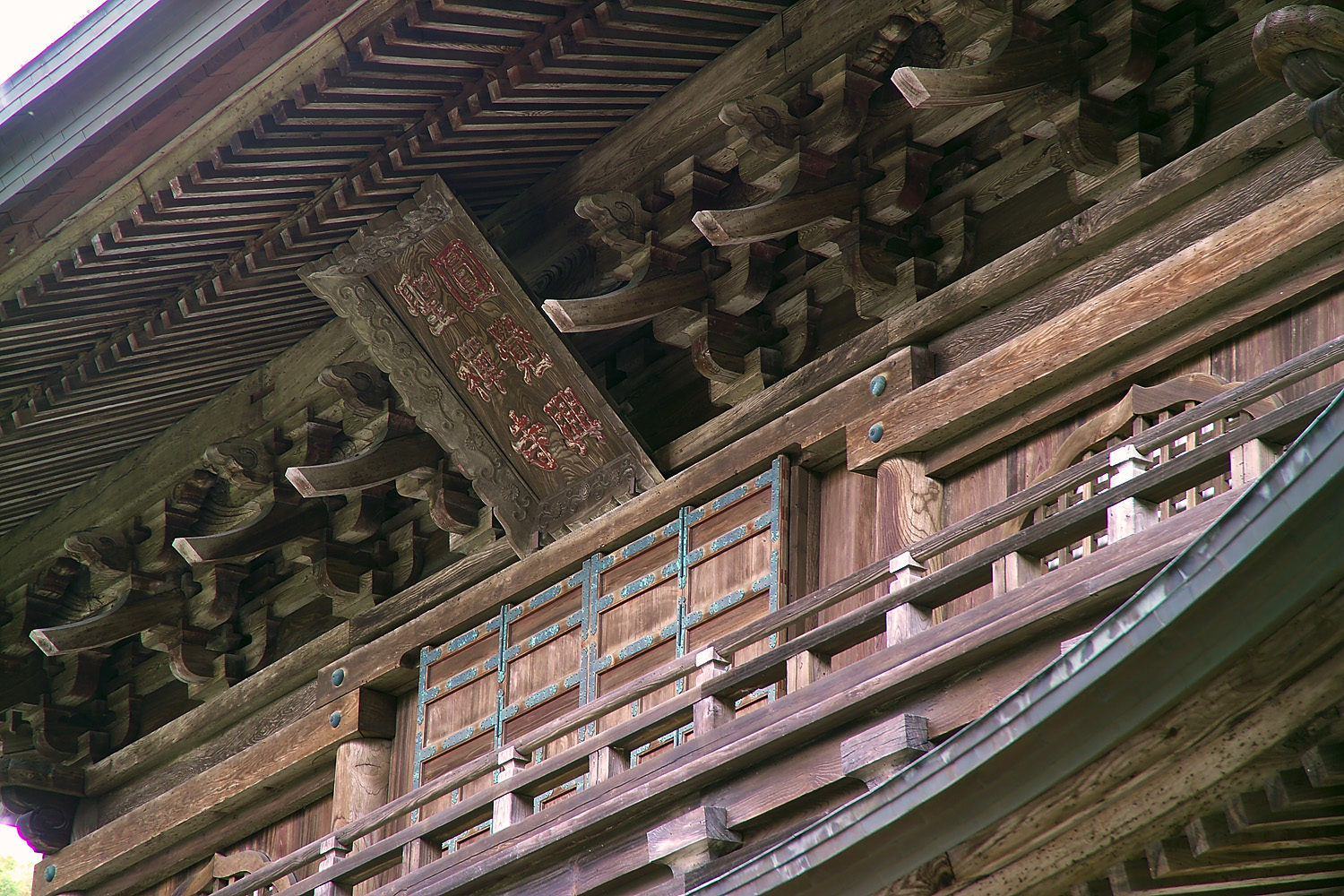
Odaruki (Engaku-ji)

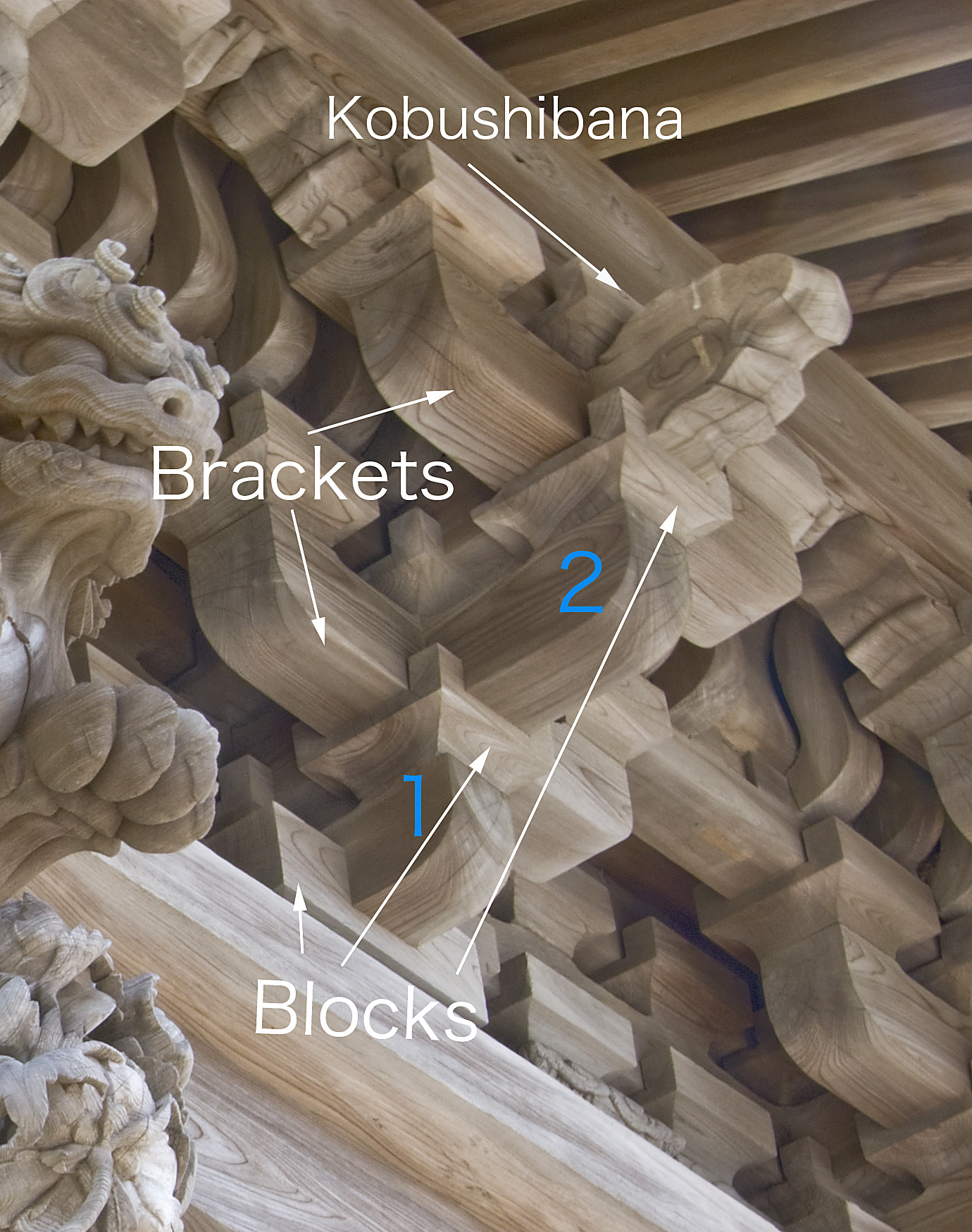
Kobushibana/kibana (Kōmyo-ji)

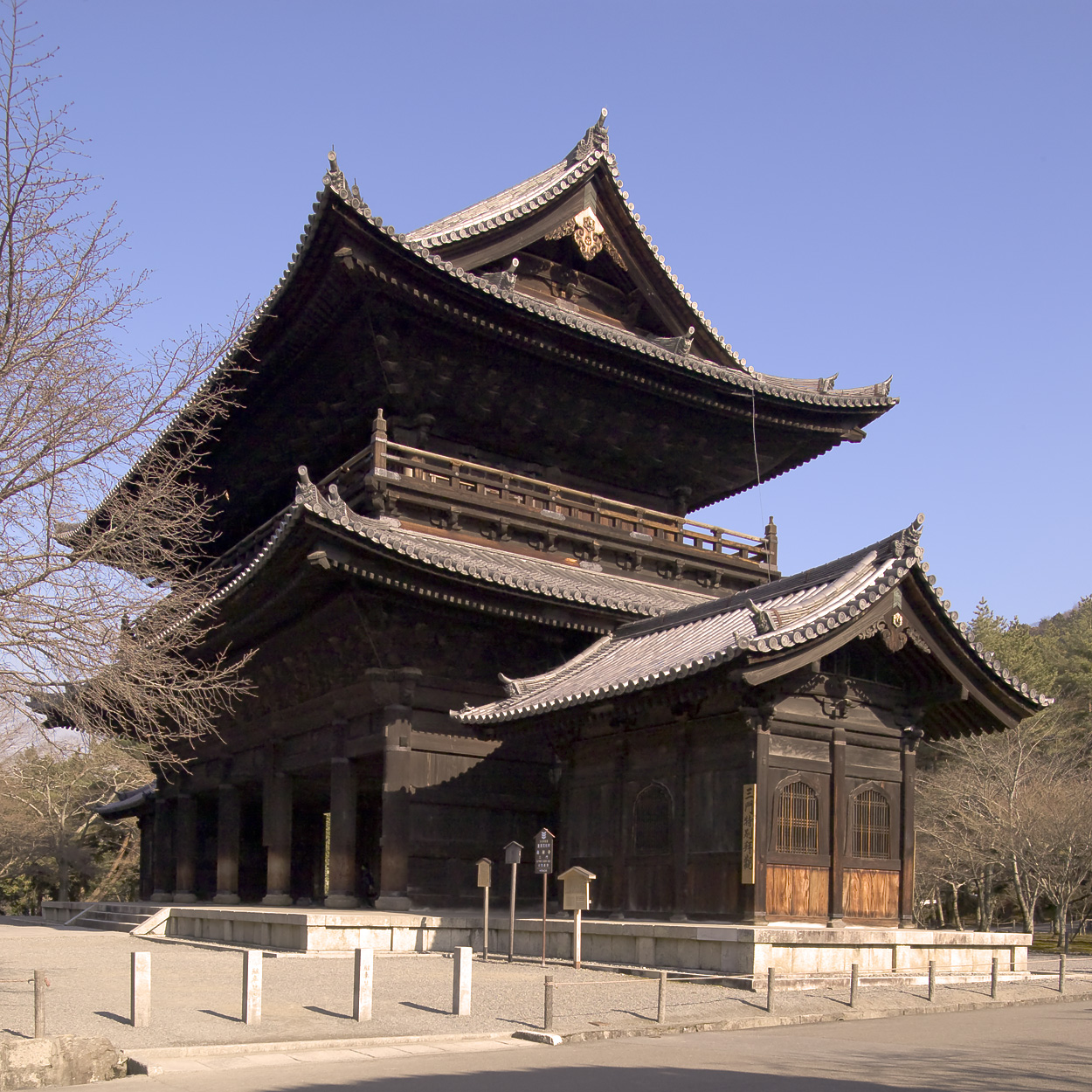
Sanmon (Nanzen-ji)

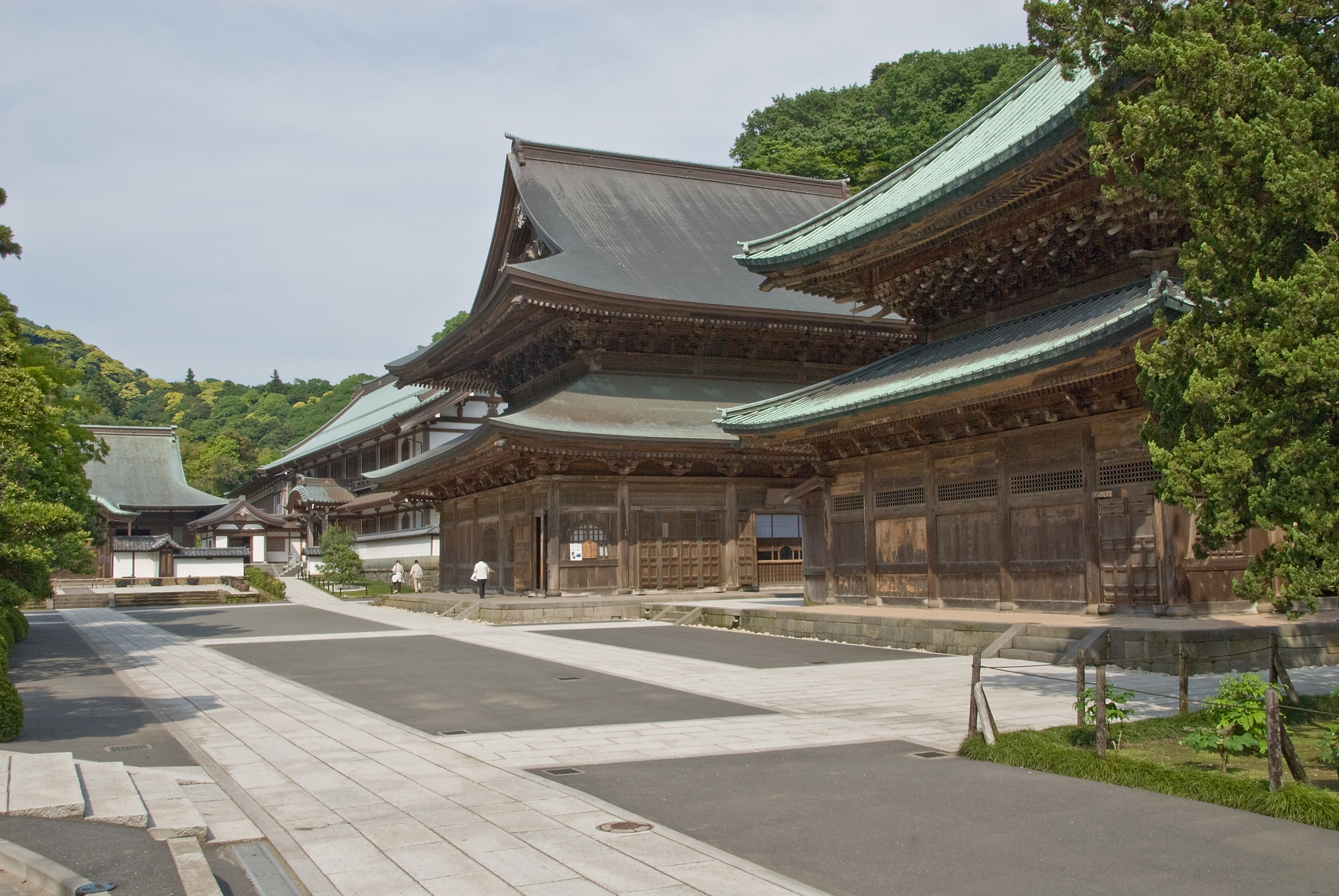
Linear layout (Kenchō-ji)

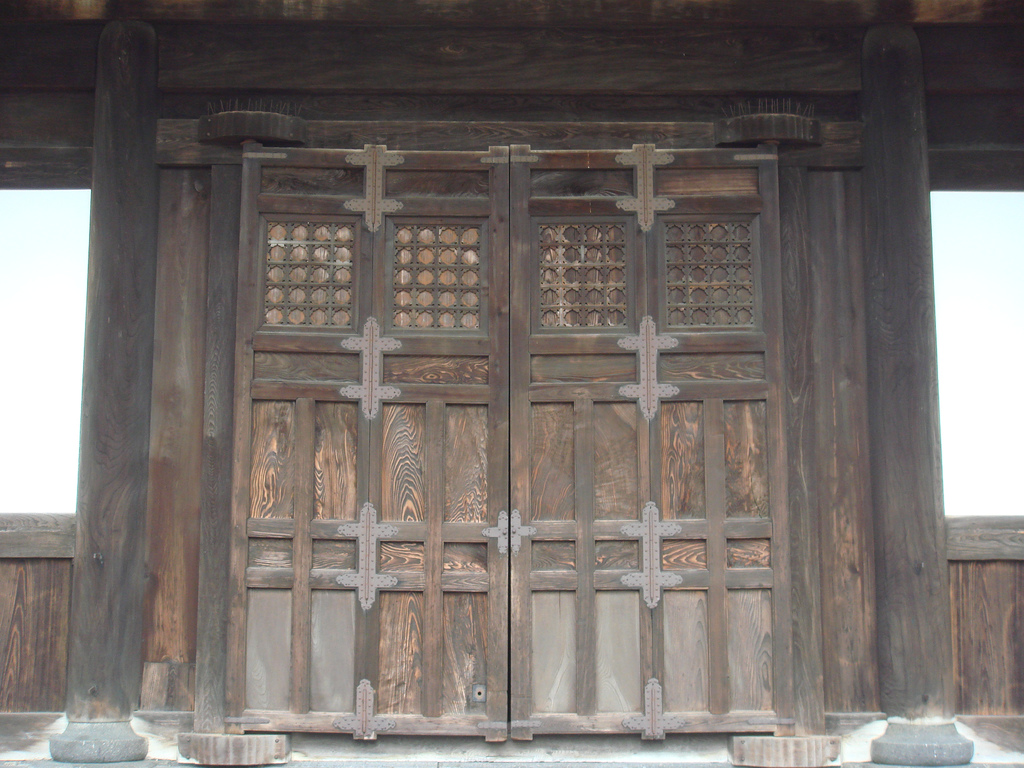
Sankarado (Kennin-ji)

== Examples ==
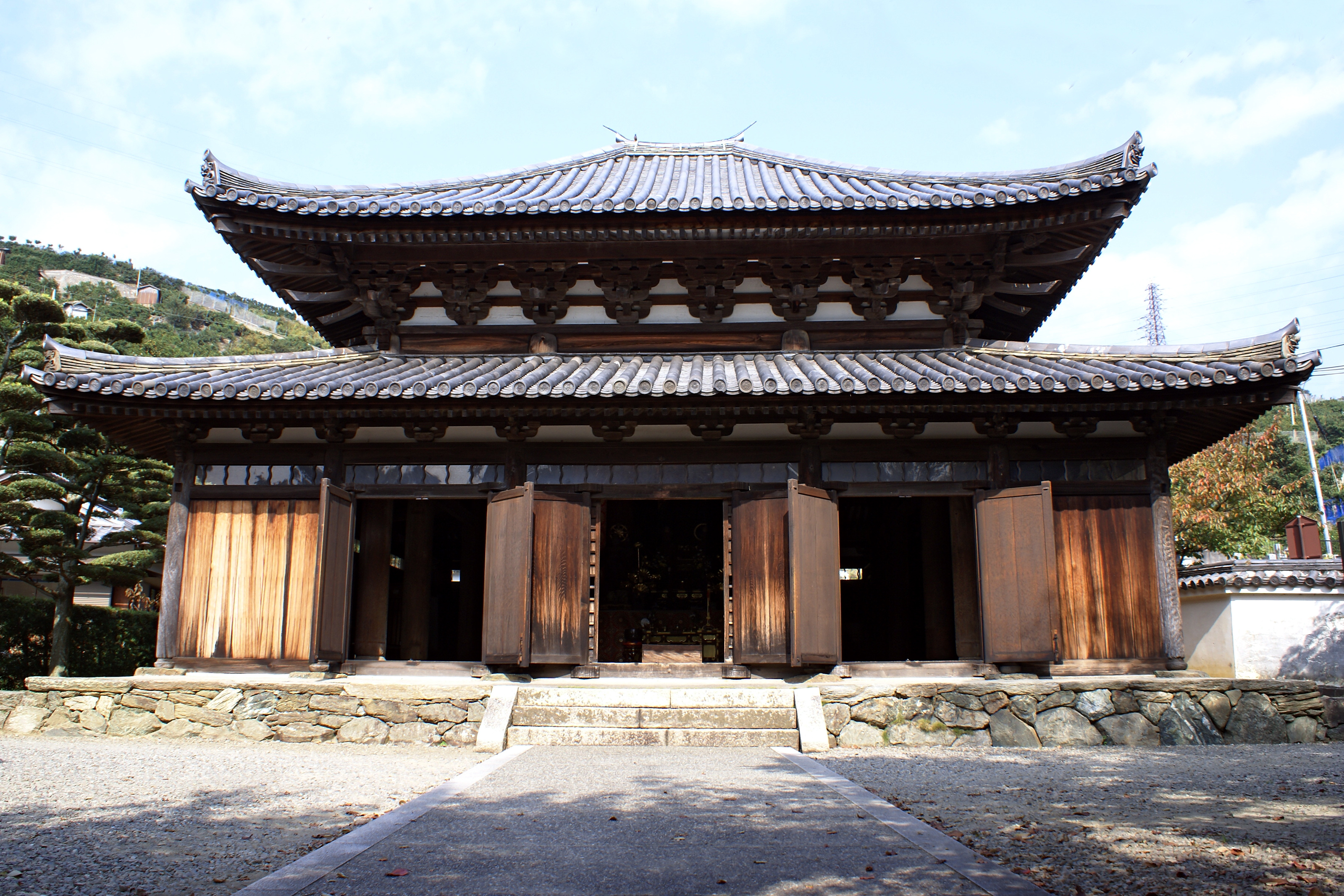
Zenpuku-in's shaka-dō, built in 1327

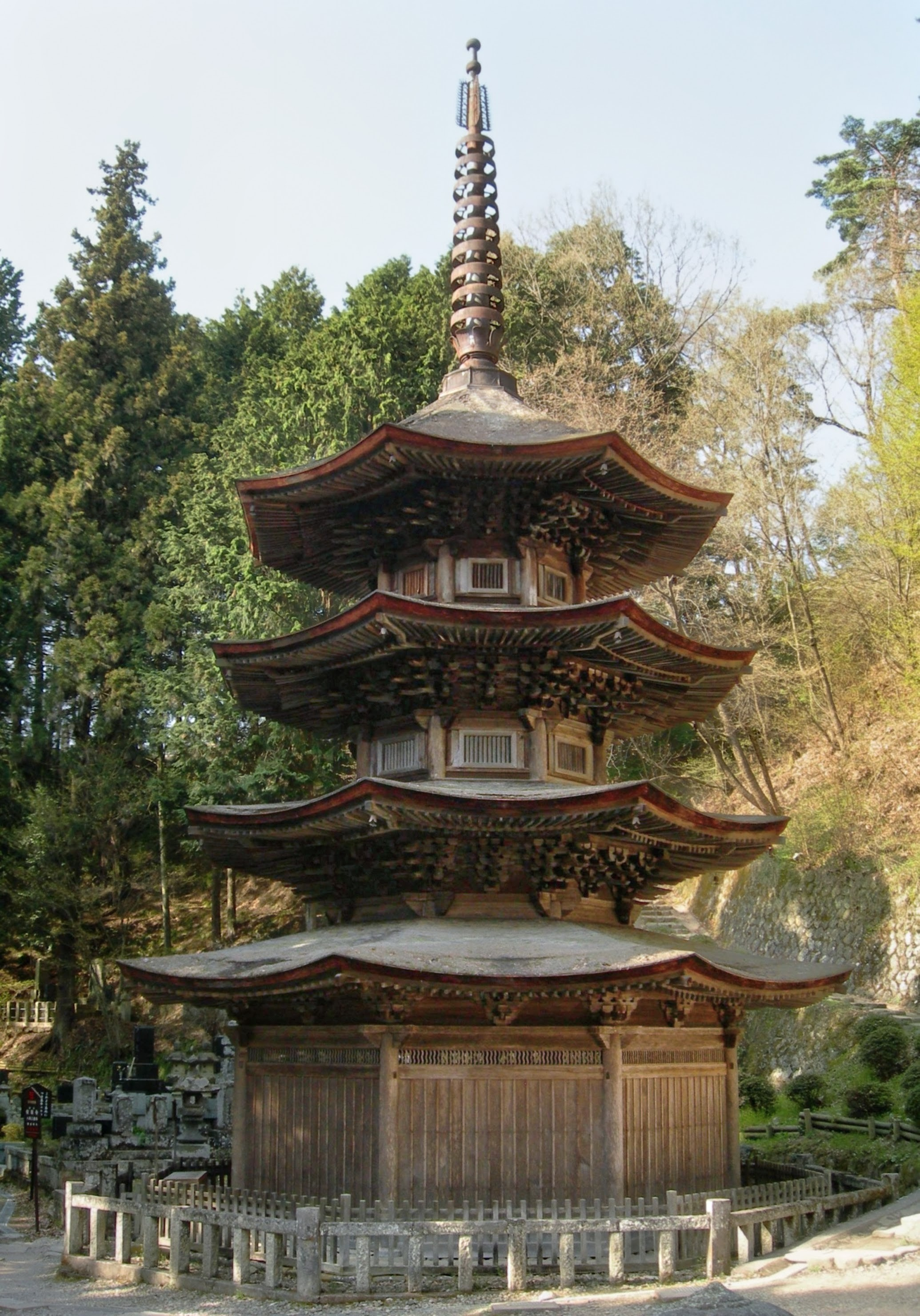
Anraku-ji's pagoda, built in the 14th century

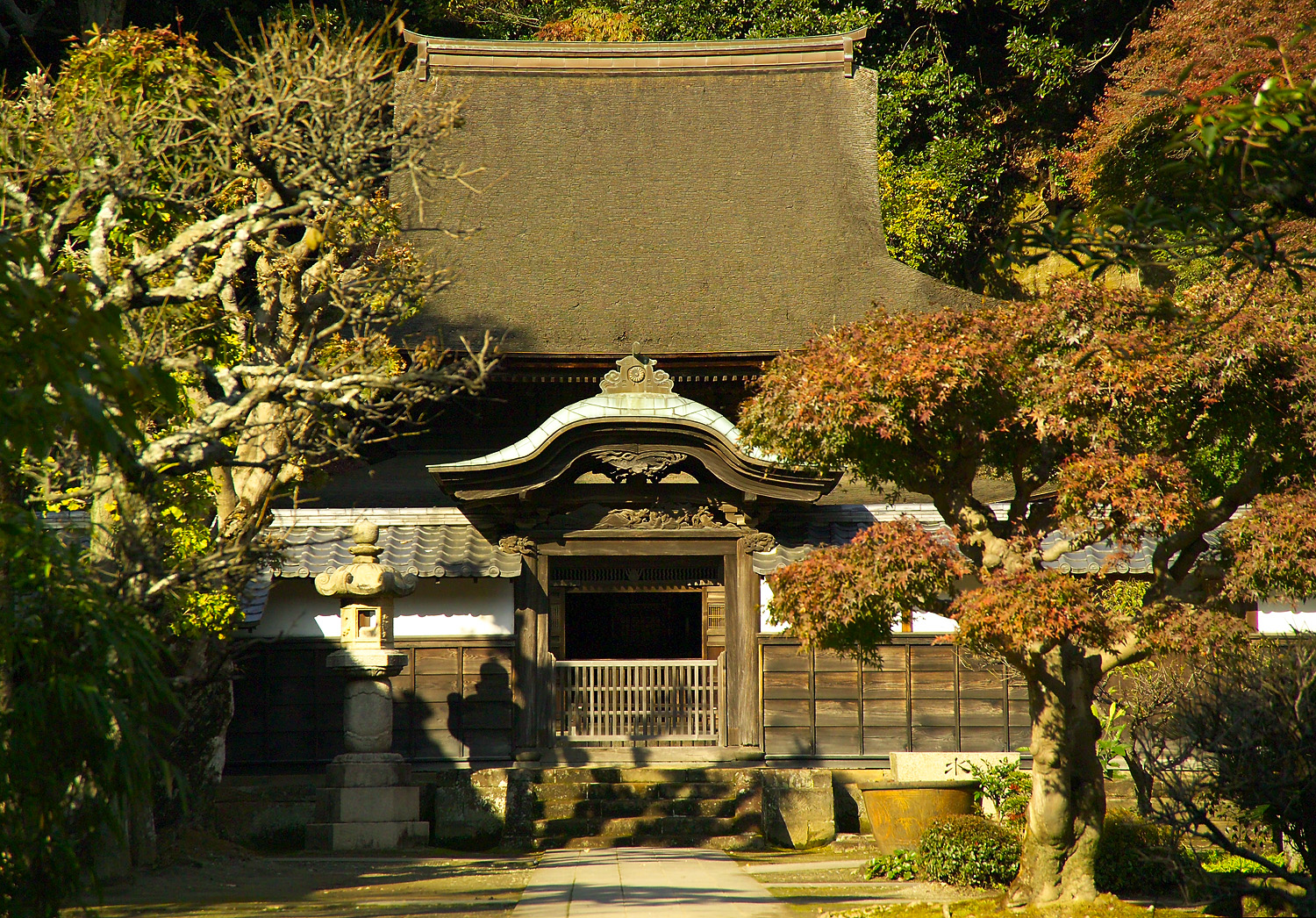
Engaku-ji's shariden

== See also ==
- Japanese Buddhist architecture - Heian period
- Setchūyō

== Bibliography ==
- Fletcher, Sir Banister; Cruickshank, Dan (1996) [1896]. Sir Banister Fletcher's a history of architecture (20th illustrated ed.). Architectural Press. ISBN 0-7506-2267-9.
- Hamashima, Masashi (1999). Jisha Kenchiku no Kanshō Kiso Chishiki (in Japanese). Tokyo: Shibundō.
- Nishi, Kazuo; Hozumi, Kazuo (1996) [1983]. What is Japanese architecture? (illustrated ed.). Kodansha International. ISBN 4-7700-1992-0.
