= Daibutsuyō =

Japanese religious architectural style

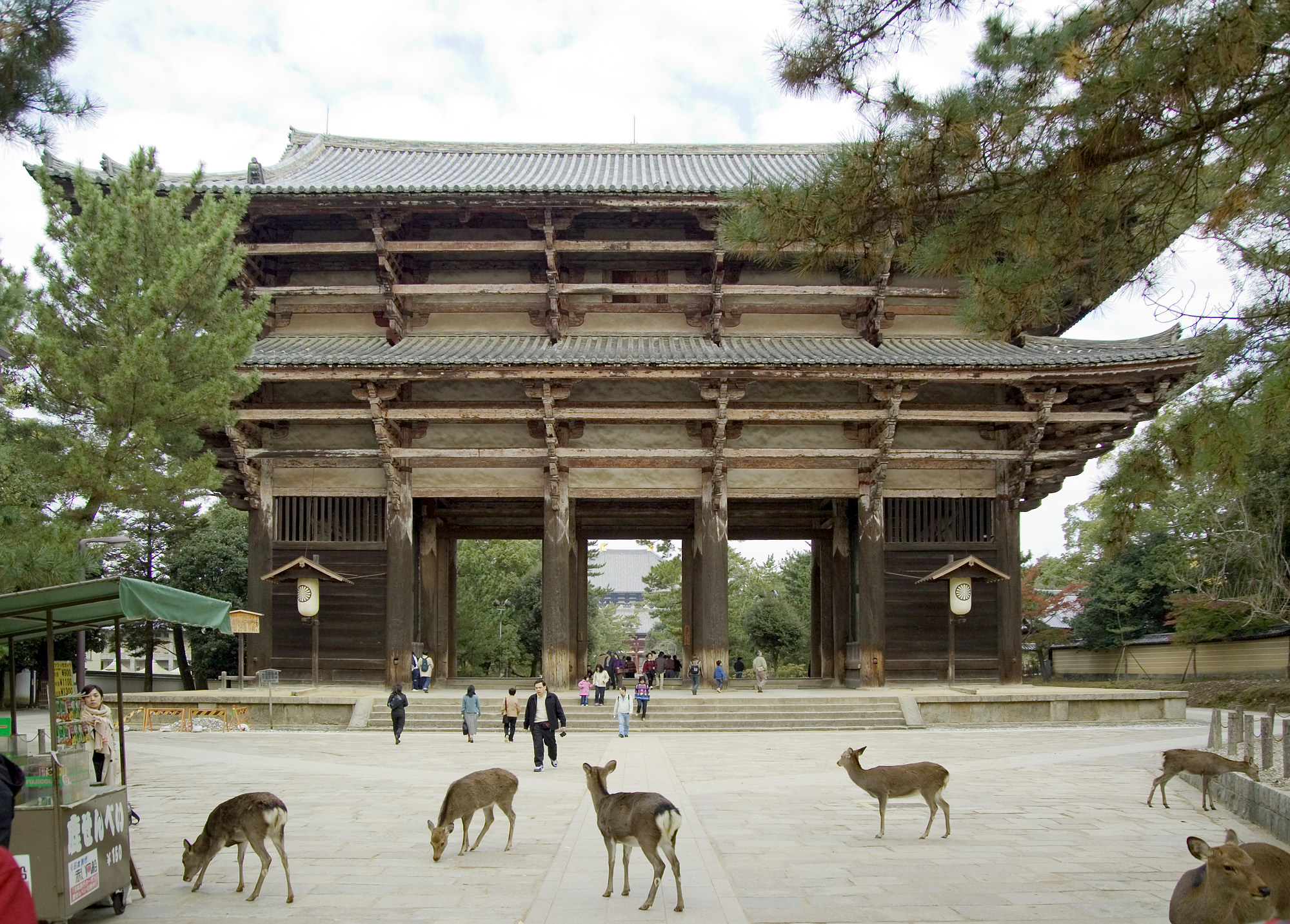
Tōdai-ji's Nandaimon is one of the few extant examples of the daibutsuyō.

Daibutsuyō (大仏様; lit. 'great Buddha style') is a Japanese religious architectural style which emerged in the late 12th or early 13th century. Together with Wayō and Zenshūyō, it is one of the three most significant styles developed by Japanese Buddhism on the basis of Chinese models. Originally called tenjikuyō (天竺様; lit. Indian style), because it had nothing to do with India it was rechristened by scholar Ōta Hirotarō during the 20th century, and the new term stuck. Ōta derived the name from Chōgen's work, particularly Tōdai-ji's Daibutsuden.

Soon abandoned after its creator's death, probably because it didn't harmonize with Japanese tastes, it nonetheless influenced other building styles with its rational solutions. The combination of wayō and daibutsuyō in particular became so frequent that sometimes it is classed separately by scholars under the name Shin-wayō (新和様; new wayō). This grandiose and monumental style is the antithesis of the simple and traditional Wayō style. The Nandaimon at Tōdai-ji and the Amida-dō at Jōdo-ji in Ono are its best extant examples.

== History ==
The style was introduced by priest Chōgen, who in 1180 directed the reconstruction of Tōdai-ji, which had been destroyed during the Genpei war. Chōgen had just come back from the last of his three travels to China and therefore chose as a basis for the work Song Dynasty architecture. He was supported in his innovative work by first shōgun Minamoto no Yoritomo.

Of his work at the temple only three structures remain, the already mentioned Nandaimon, which remains the best Daibutsuyō example, the Kaizandō and the Hokkedō. The gate's most characteristic features are the six-tier bracket groups (tokyō) projecting directly out of the columns and connected to each other by ties as long as the facade. During the Edo period the temple's Main Hall, the Daibutsuden, was also rebuilt in the style, to which it would give its name.

Chōgen built other buildings in this style near and around Nara, of which the Amida-dō at Jōdo-ji in Ono is a good extant example.

The style declined quickly after its creator's death, probably because it did not agree with Japanese tastes. Structural elements are treated as design elements, and the building's deliberate roughness is supposed to be part of its beauty, but the concept was probably too alien to Chōgen's contemporaries, and was rejected.

== Features ==
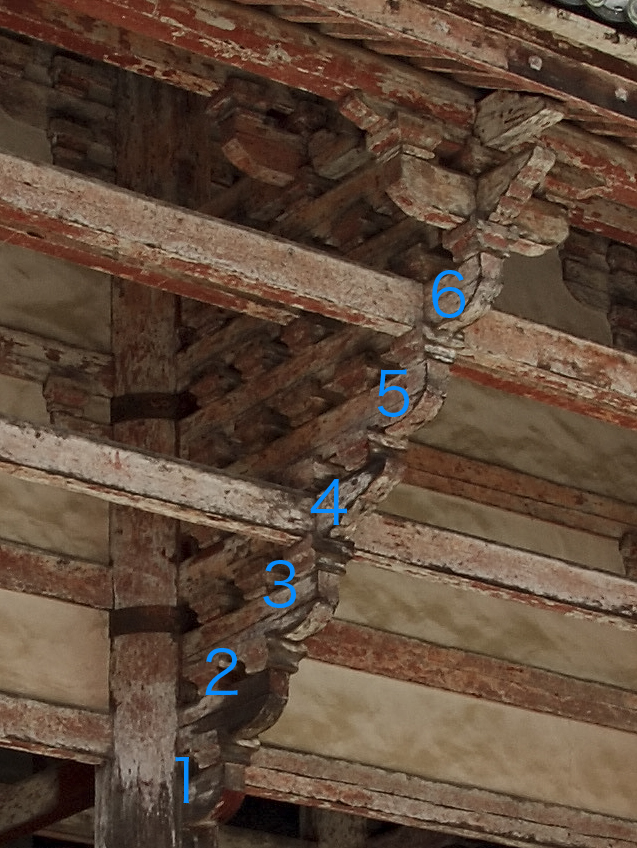
Nandaimon (detail). Note the exposed tōrihijiki.

The Daibutsuyō style was short-lived but innovative, and many of the ideas it introduced were adopted by other styles as well. In particular, during the Muromachi period the traditional Wayō style was so heavily influenced that the mix of the two is sometimes called Shin-wayō.

- Thick woodwork and imposing general look
- Use of penetrating tie beams

During the Heian period temples were built using only non-penetrating tie beams (nageshi (長押)) made to fit around columns and pillars and nailed. The daibutsuyō style, first, and the zenshūyō style, later, replaced them with penetrating tie-beams (nuki (貫)), which actually pierced the column, and were therefore much more effective against earthquakes. The nageshi was however retained as a purely decorative element.

- Thick, visible structural elements with decorative function

As already mentioned, many structural elements are left uncovered and have a decorative function. For example, the roof's supporting members are not covered by a ceiling and are therefore fully visible from within the temple. The Nandaimon's stabilizing bracket ties (tōrihijiki (通り肘木)) which run the entire width of the gate are also fully visible (see photo on the right). (Other styles hide them, at least partially.) Structural elements are much thicker than in Zen buildings.

- Sashihijiki

The sashihijiki (挿肘木) is a bracket arm inserted directly into a pillar instead of resting onto a supporting block on top of a pillar, as was normal in the preceding wayō style (see photo on the right). At Tōdai-ji, both the Nandaimon and the Daibutsuden have six sashihijiki one on top of the other (mutesaki tokyō). (On the subject, see also the article Tokyō).

- Ōgidaruki

Another detail unique to this style are the ōgidaruki (扇垂木; lit. fan rafters). The rafters supporting each roof corner spread from a single point, in a fan-like pattern.

- Kibana

The tips of each protruding beam ends in a nose-like structure called kibana (木鼻; lit. wooden nose).

== Examples of the Daibutsuyō style ==
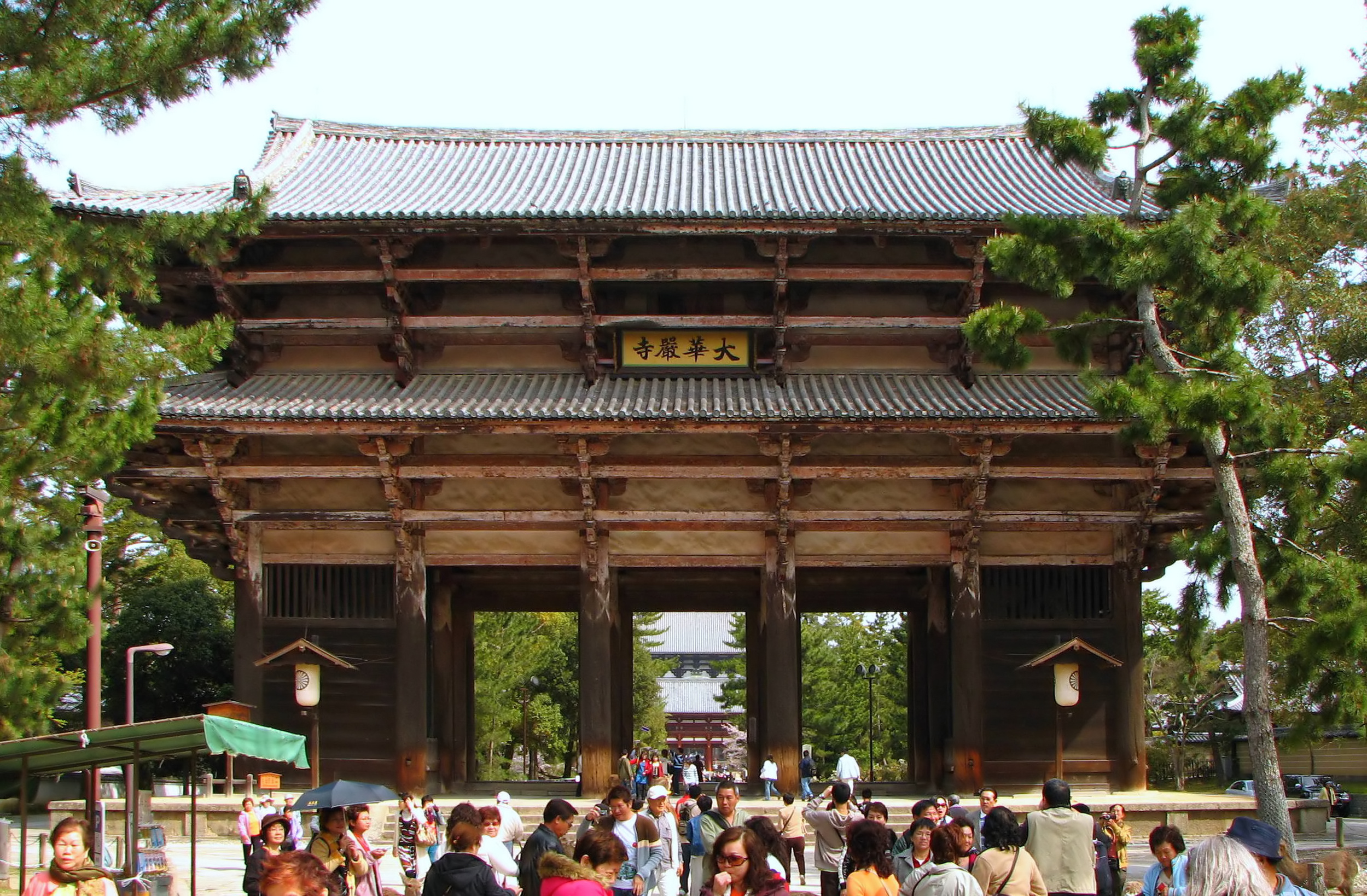
Tōdai-ji's Nandaimon

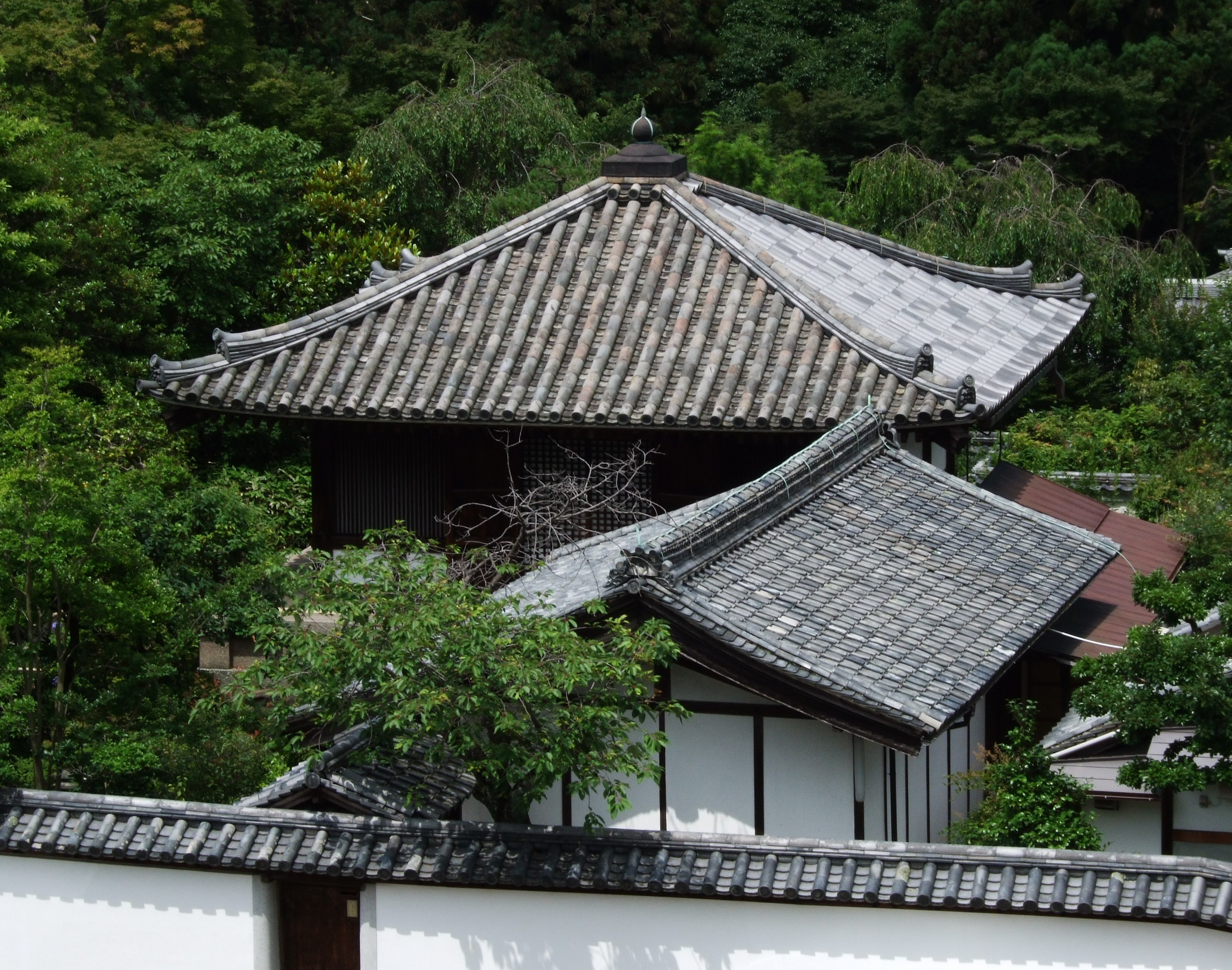
Tōdai-ji's Kaizan-dō

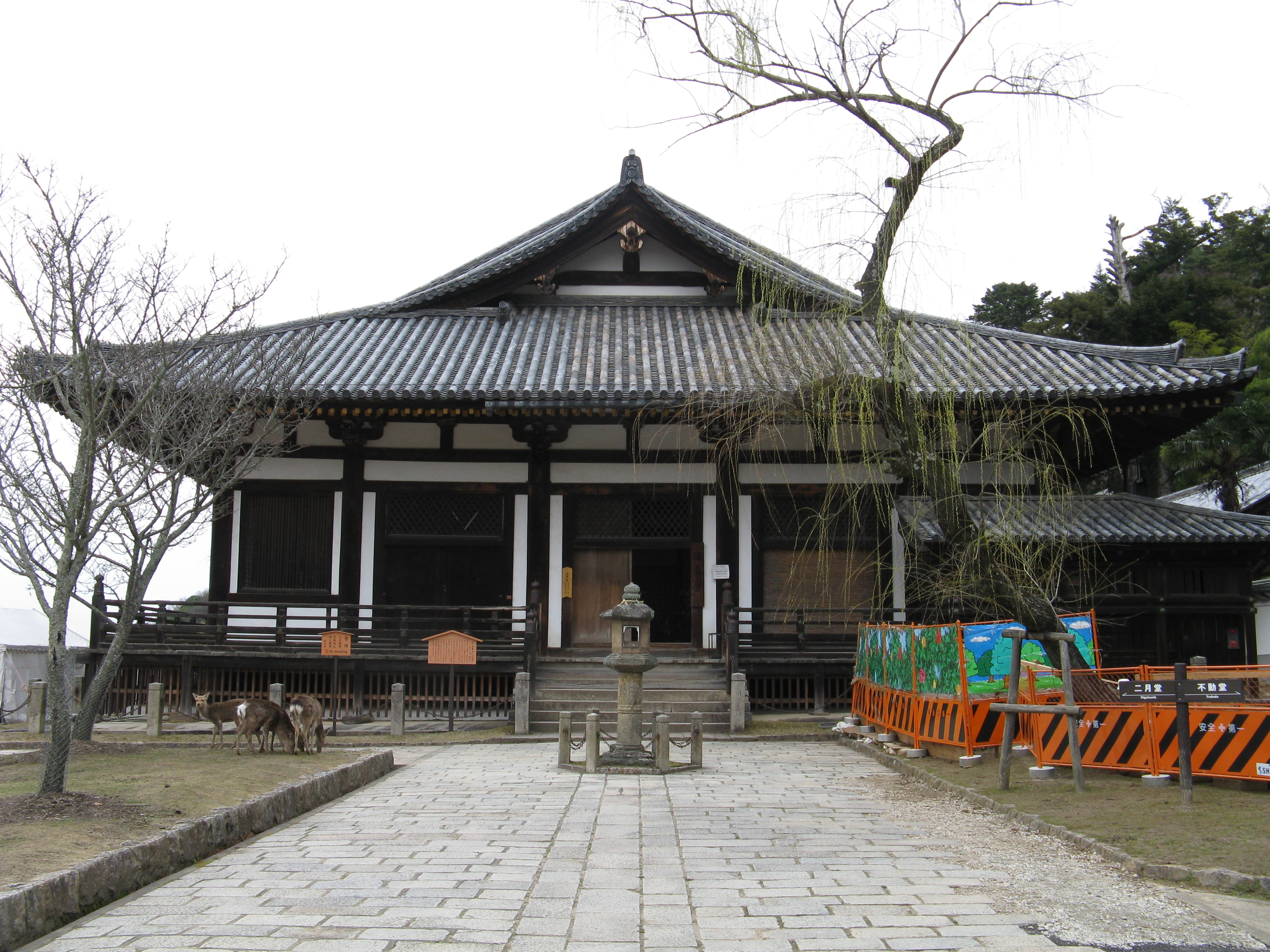
Tōdai-ji's Hokke-dō

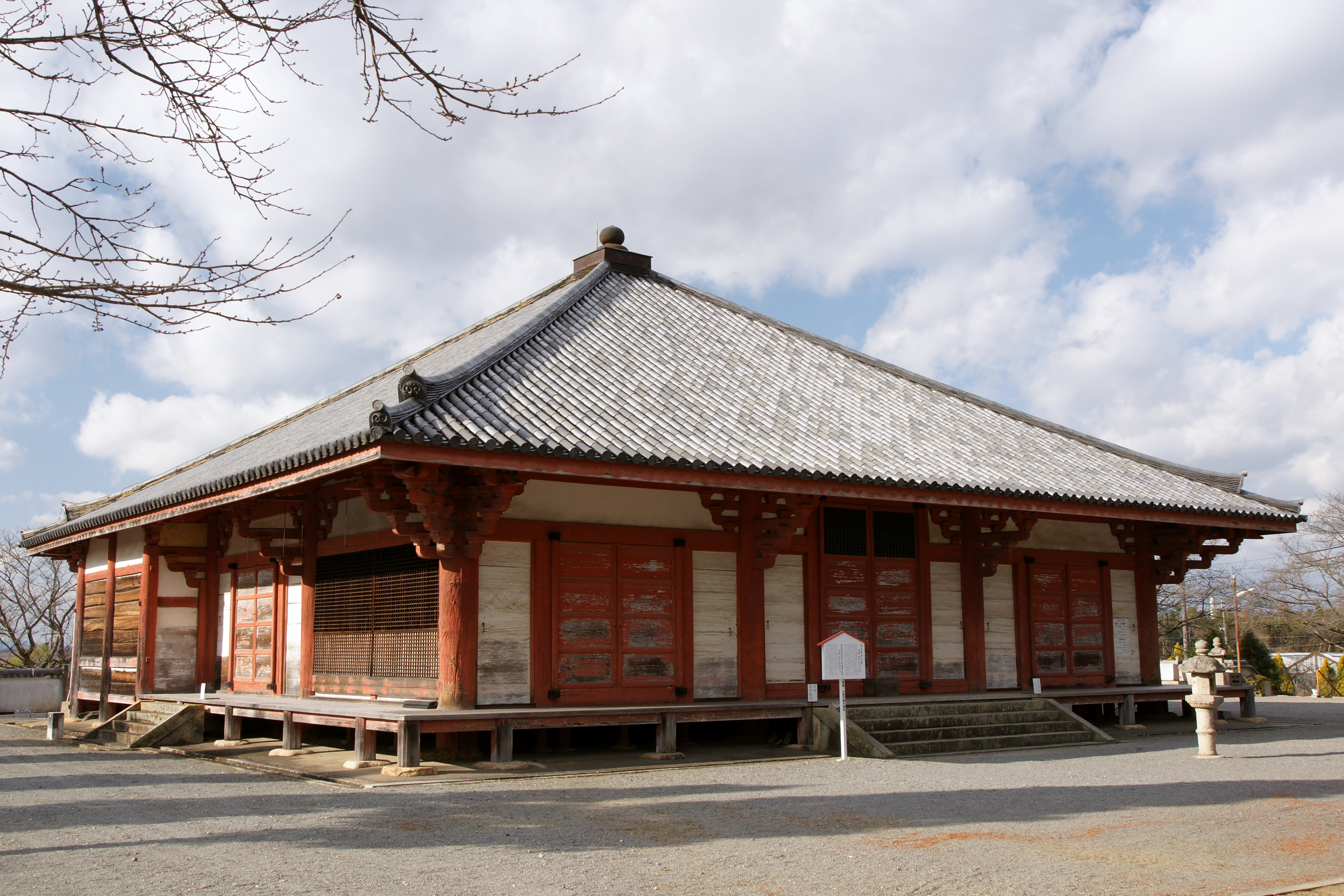
Jōdo-ji's Amida-dō

== See also ==
- Japanese Buddhist architecture - Heian period
- Setchūyō

== Bibliography ==
- Fletcher, Sir Banister; Cruickshank, Dan (1996) [1896]. Sir Banister Fletcher's a history of architecture (20th illustrated ed.). Architectural Press. ISBN 0-7506-2267-9.
- "JAANUS". Japanese Architecture and Art Net Users System.
- Nishi, Kazuo; Hozumi, Kazuo (1996) [1983]. What is Japanese architecture? (illustrated ed.). Kodansha International. ISBN 4-7700-1992-0.
- Young, David; Young, Michiko Kimura; Yew, Tan Hong (2004). Introduction to Japanese architecture. Periplus Asian architecture (illustrated ed.). Tuttle Publishing. ISBN 0-7946-0100-6.
