= Setchūyō =

Japanese architectural stye

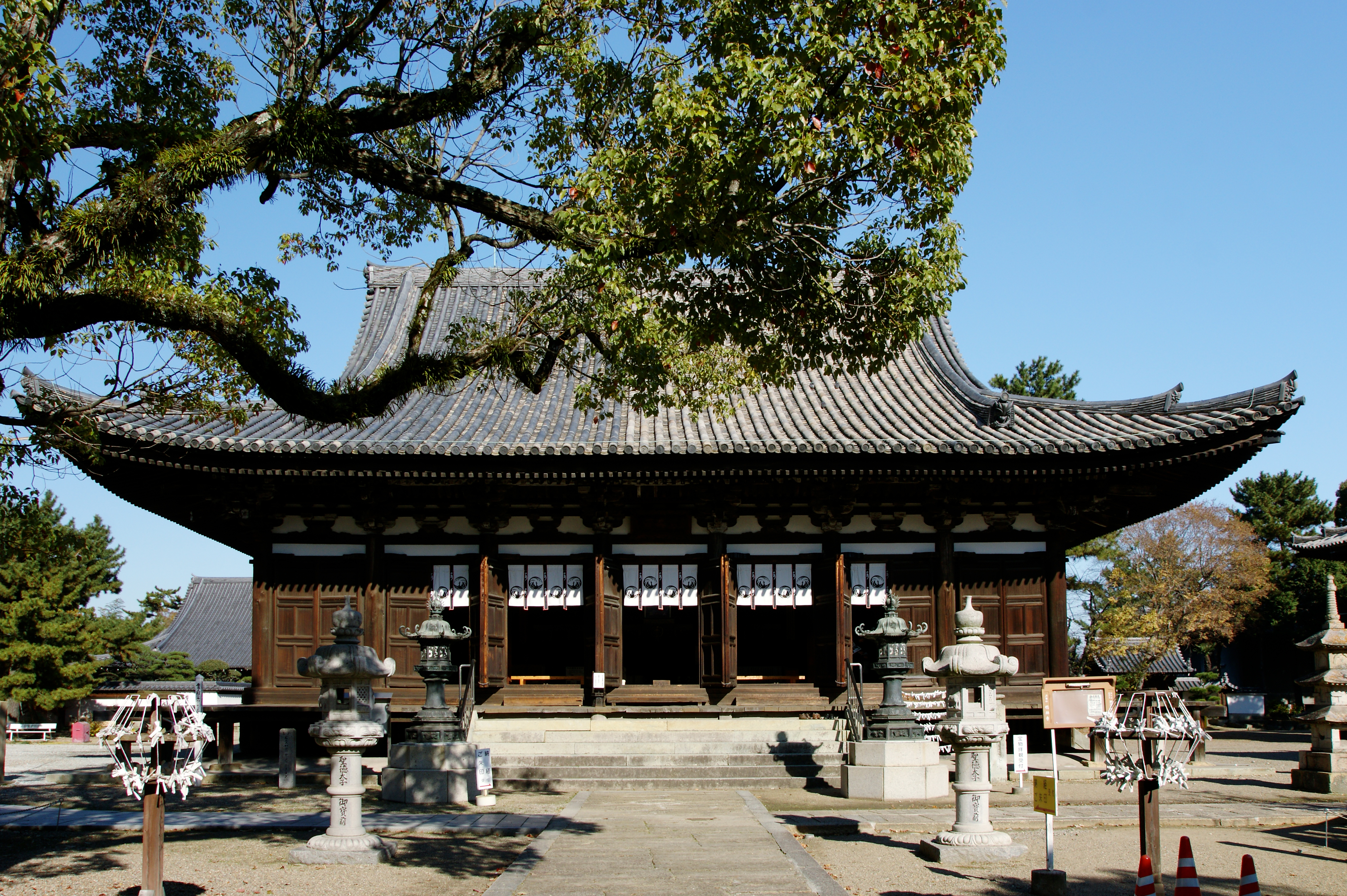
Kakurin-ji's Main Hall

Setchūyō (折衷様; lit. 'eclectic style') is an architectural style born in Japan during the Muromachi period from the fusion of elements from three different antecedent styles: wayō, daibutsuyō, and zenshūyō. It is exemplified by the main hall at Kakurin-ji. The combination of wayō and daibutsuyō in particular became so frequent that sometimes it is classed separately by scholars under the name Shin-wayō (新和様, new wayō).

== See also ==
- Japanese Buddhist architecture - Heian period

== Bibliography ==
- Fletcher, Banister; Cruickshank, Dan (1996) [1896]. Sir Banister Fletcher's a History of Architecture (20th illustrated ed.). Architectural Press. ISBN 0-7506-2267-9.
- Young, David; Young, Michiko (2007) [2004]. The art of Japanese architecture. Architecture and Interior Design (illustrated, revised ed.). Tuttle Publishing. ISBN 978-0-8048-3838-2.
