= Wayō =

Buddhist architectural style in Japan

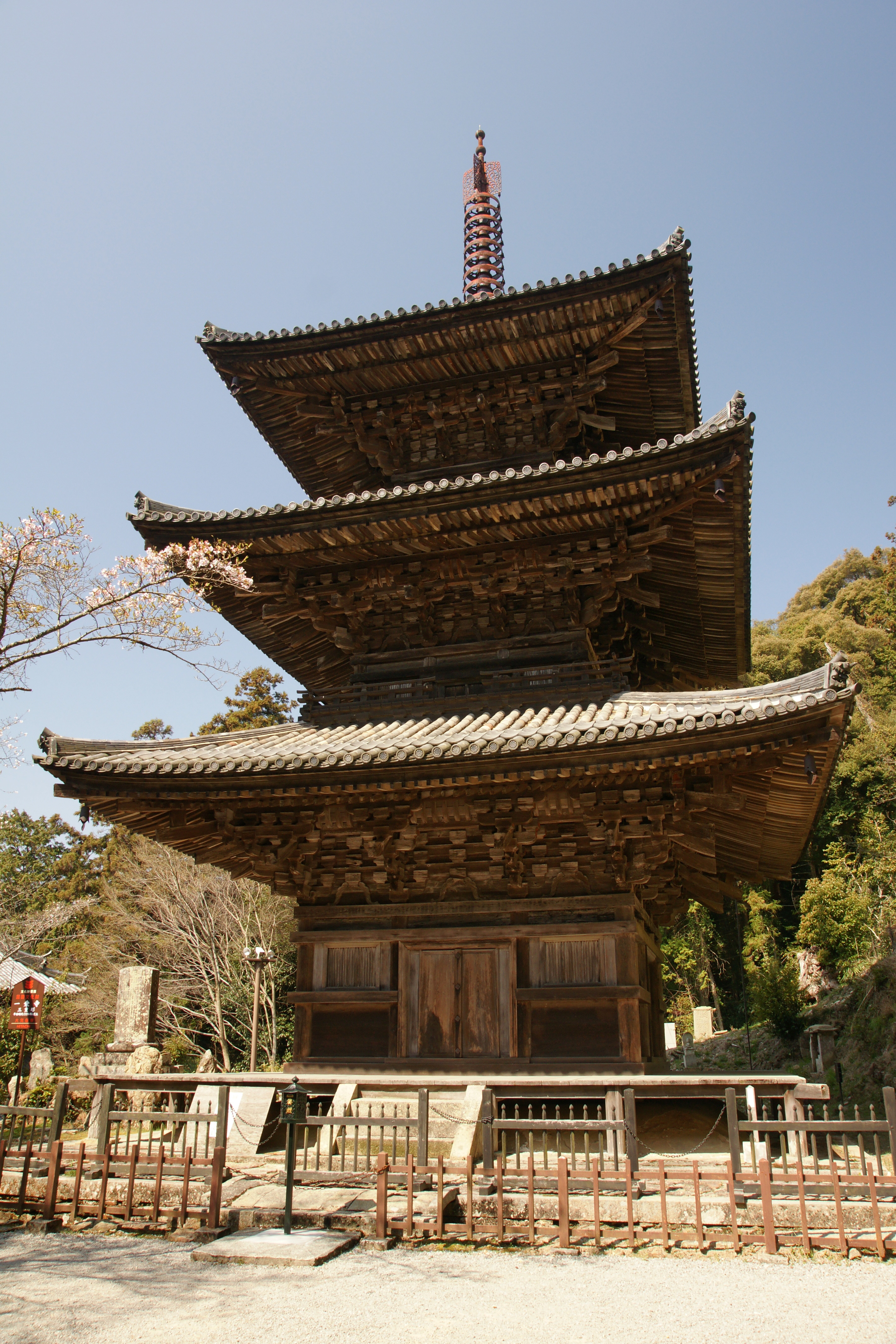
Ichijō-ji's pagoda is an example of the wayō style.

Wayō (和様; lit. 'Japanese style') is a Buddhist architectural style developed in Japan before the Kamakura period (1185－1333), and is one of the important Buddhist architectural styles in Japan along with Daibutsuyō and the Zenshūyō, which were developed based on Chinese architectural styles from the Kamakura period. This style originated in the Asuka (538－710) and Nara period (710－794), when Japanese studied Buddhist architecture of the Tang dynasty, and was improved in the Heian period (794－1185) to suit the Japanese climate and aesthetic sense. After the Kamakura period, the Wayō developed into the Shin-wayō style by combining it with the Daibutsuyō, and further developed into the Setchūyō by combining it with the Zenshūyō, and pure Wayō architecture decreased.

== Overview ==
The name was coined later, during the Kamakura period when the other two styles were born. Because by then the style was considered to be native, the term started to be used to distinguish older styles from those just arrived from China. It was characterized by simplicity, refraining from ornamentation, use of natural timber and in general plain materials. Structurally, it was distinguished by a main hall divided in two parts, an outer area for novices and an inner area for initiates, a hip-and-gable roof covering both areas, a raised wooden floor instead of the tile or stone floors of earlier temples, extended eaves to cover the front steps; shingles or bark rather than tile roofing; and a disposition of the shichidō garan adapting to the natural environment, rather than following the symmetrical layouts prevalent for example in Zen temples.

During the Heian period temples were built using only non-penetrating tie beams (nageshi (長押)) made to fit around columns and pillars and nailed. The daibutsuyō style, first, and the zenshūyō style, later, replaced them with penetrating tie-beams (nuki (長押)), which actually pierced the column, and were therefore much more effective against earthquakes. The nageshi was, however, retained as a purely decorative element.

Temples in this style, uninfluenced by the later styles, can be found mostly in the Kansai region, and particularly in Nara.

== Shin-Wayō ==
During the Muromachi period, the combination of wayō with elements of the daibutsuyō style became so frequent that sometimes it is called by scholars Shin-wayō (新和様, new wayō).

== See also ==
- Japanese Buddhist architecture § Heian period
- Setchūyō

== Bibliography ==
- Nishi, Kazuo; Hozumi, Kazuo (1996) [1983]. What is Japanese architecture? (illustrated ed.). Kodansha International. ISBN 4-7700-1992-0.
- Young, David; Young, Michiko (2007) [2004]. The art of Japanese architecture. Architecture and Interior Design (illustrated, revised ed.). Tuttle Publishing. ISBN 978-0-8048-3838-2.
- Young, David; Young, Michiko Kimura; Yew, Tan Hong (2004). Introduction to Japanese architecture. Periplus Asian architecture (illustrated ed.). Tuttle Publishing. ISBN 0-7946-0100-6.
