= Dō (architecture) =

Traditional Japanese buildings

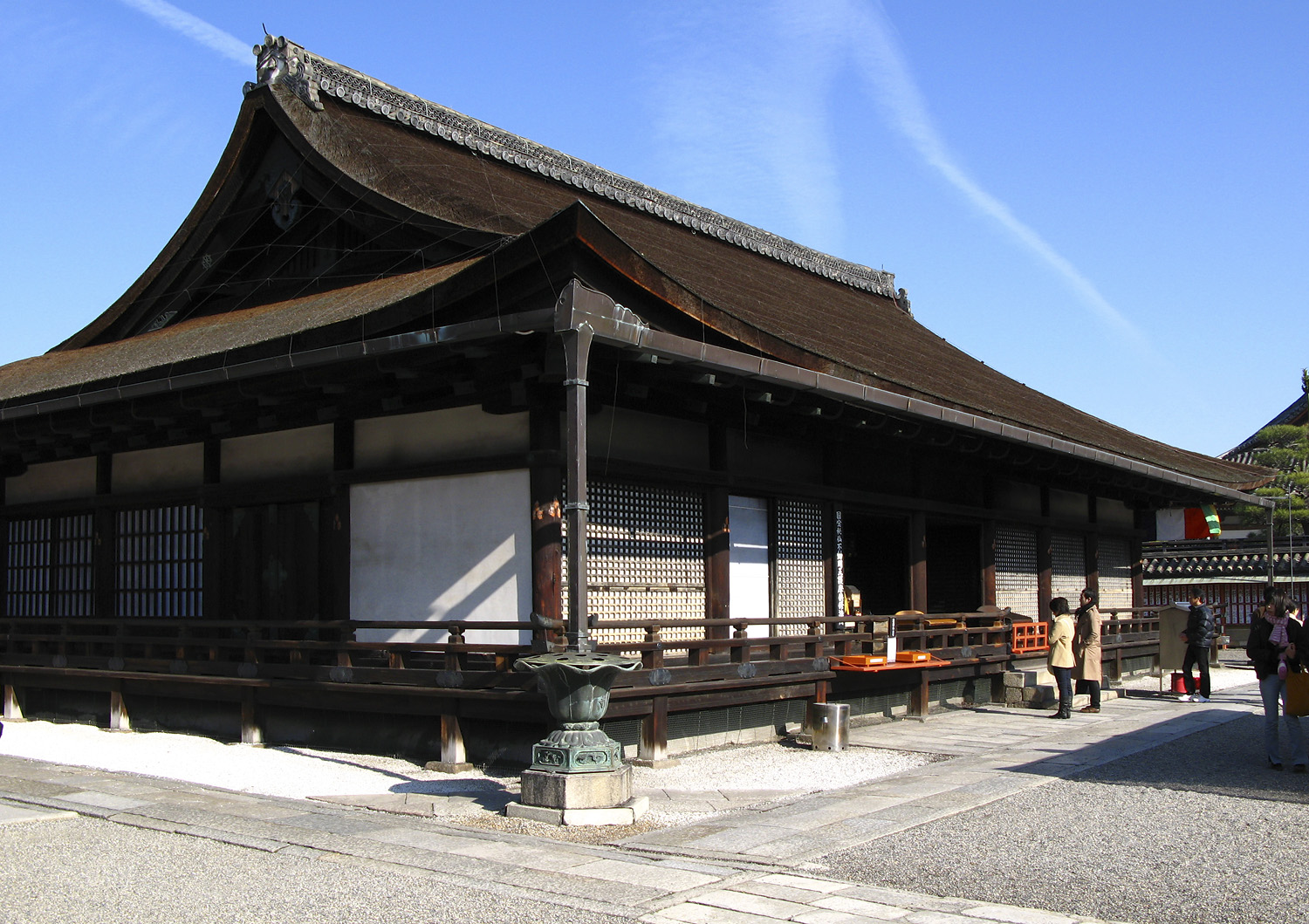
A miei-dō

Dō (堂; temple, shrine, hall, reception room; also shop, store) is very often used in Japanese Buddhism as a suffix in the name of some of the many buildings that can be part of a Japanese temple compound. (Other endings, for example -den as in butsuden, exist.) The suffix can be the name of a deity associated with it (e.g. Yakushi-dō, a name customarily translated as "Yakushi Hall") or express the building's function within the temple's compound (e.g. hon-dō, or main hall). (Note: Hall names are capitalized only when they refer to specific examples (e.g. XX-ji's Main Hall) or include proper names of deities (e.g. Yakushi-dō).)

Some words ending in -dō are Butsu-dō, hō-dō, hon-dō, jiki-dō, kaisan-dō, kō-dō, kon-dō, kyō-dō, mandara-dō, miei-dō, mi-dō, sō-dō, Yakushi-dō and zen-dō. With some exceptions, for example the words hondō, hokke-dō and kon-dō, these terms do not indicate any particular structure.

The suffix is used sometimes also in a lay context, as for example in the word shokudō (食堂; lit. 'food building, meaning restaurant or cafeteria').

A dō's size is measured in ken, where a ken is the interval between two pillars of a traditional-style building. A kon-dō for example is a 9x7 ken. The word is usually translated in English as "bay" and is better understood as an indication of proportions than as a unit of measurement.

== Types ==
- Amida-dō (阿弥陀堂) – a building that enshrines a statue of Amida.
- daishi-dō (大師堂) – lit. "great master hall". A building dedicated to Kōbō Daishi (Shingon) or Dengyō Daishi (Tendai).
- hattō* (法堂) – lit. Dharma hall". A building dedicated to lectures by the chief priest on Buddhism's scriptures (the hō).
- hō-dō (法堂) – see hattō.
- hokke-dō* (法華堂) – lit. "Lotus Sūtra hall". In Tendai Buddhism, a hall whose layout allows walking around a statue for meditation. The purpose of walking is to concentrate on the Lotus Sũtra and seek the ultimate truth.
- hon-dō* (本堂) – lit. "main hall", it is the building that houses the most important statues and objects of cult. The term is thought to have evolved to avoid the term kon-dō used by six Nara sects (the Nanto Rokushū) for their main halls. Structurally similar, but its inner less strictly defined.
- jiki-dō* (食堂) – a monastery's refectory.
- kaisan-dō (開山堂) – founder's hall, usually at a Zen temple. Building enshrining a statue, portrait or memorial tablet of the founder of either the temple or the sect it belongs to. Jōdo sect temples often call it miei-dō.
- kō-dō* (講堂) – lecture hall of a non-Zen garan.
- kon-dō* (金堂) – lit. "golden hall", it is the main hall of a garan, housing the main object of worship. Unlike a butsuden, it is a true two-story building (although the second story may sometimes be missing) which measures 9x7 bays.
- kyō-dō (経堂) – see kyōzō.
- kyōzō (経蔵) – lit. "scriptures deposit". Repository of sūtras and books about the temple's history. Also called kyō-dō.
- mandara-dō (曼荼羅堂) – lit. "hall of mandalas", but the name is now used only for Taima-dera's Main Hall in Nara.
- miei-dō* (御影堂) – lit. "image hall". Building housing an image of the temple's founder, equivalent to a Zen sect's kaisan-dō.
- mi-dō (御堂) – a generic honorific term for a building which enshrines a sacred statue.
- rokkaku-dō (六角堂) – a hexagonal temple building. An example of this type of structure gives its nickname to Kyoto's Chōhō-ji, better known as Rokkaku-dō.
- shaka-dō (釈迦堂) – lit. Shakyamuni hall. A building enshrining a statue of Buddha.
- sō-dō* (僧堂) – lit. "monk hall". A building dedicated to the practice of zazen. It used to be dedicated to various activities, from eating to sleeping, centered on zazen.
- soshi-dō (祖師堂) – lit. "patriarchs hall". A building dedicated to the soshi, important teachers and priests.
- Yakushi-dō* (薬師堂) – a building that enshrines a statue of Yakushi Nyorai.
- zen-dō* (禅堂) – lit. "hall of Zen". The building where monks practice zazen, and one of the main structures of a Zen garan.
