= Niōmon =

Buddhist temple gate

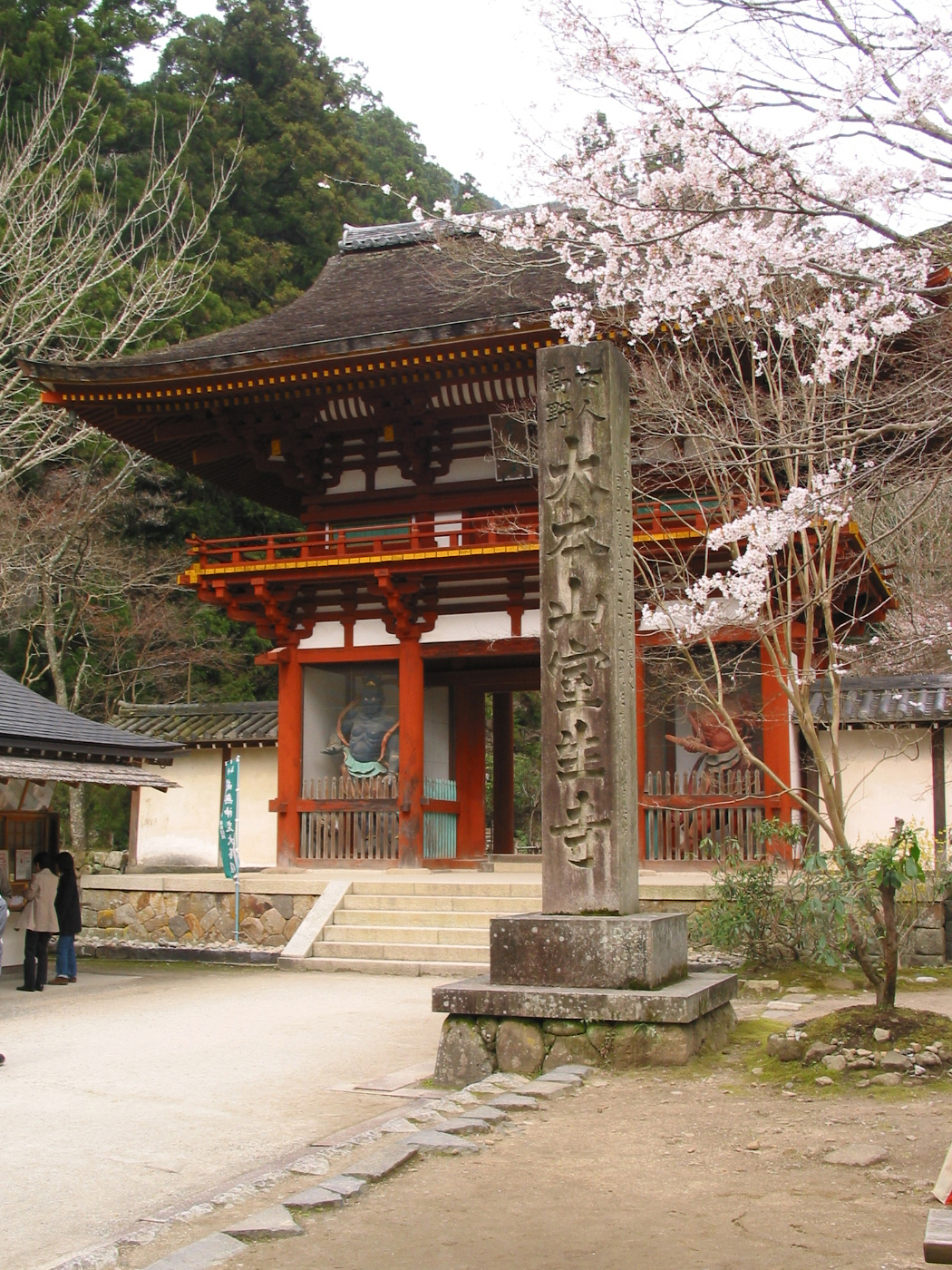
Niōmon

Niōmon (仁王門; lit. 'Niō gate') is the Japanese name of a Buddhist temple gate guarded by two wooden warriors called Niō (lit. Two Kings). The gate is called Heng Ha Er Jiang (哼哈二将) in China and Geumgangmun in Korea. The two statues are inside the two posts of the gate itself, one at the left, one at the right. Structurally, it usually is either a rōmon or a nijūmon and can measure either 5x2 or 3x2 bays. It can sometimes have just one story, as in the case of Asakusa's Kaminarimon.

In a five-bay gate, the figures of the two Niō are usually enshrined in the two outer bays, but can be sometimes found also in the inner ones. The statue on the right is called Naraen Kongō (那羅延金剛) and has his mouth open to utter the first letter of the Sanskrit alphabet, which is pronounced "a". The left statue is called Misshaku Kongō (密迹金剛) and has his mouth closed, representing the last letter of the Sanskrit alphabet, pronounced "um". These two letters (a-un in Japanese) together symbolize the birth and death of all things.

The two Niō
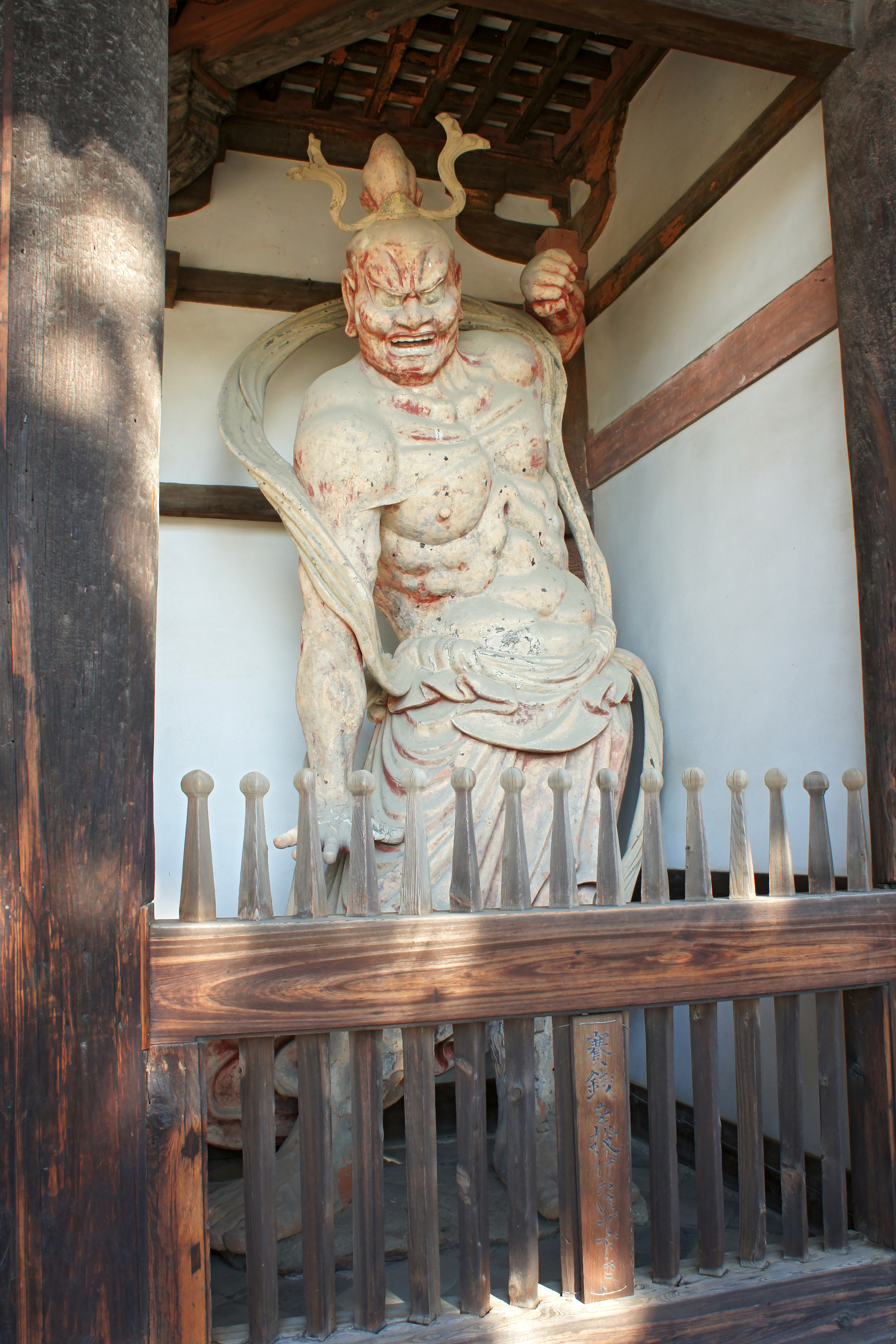
Misshaku Kongō

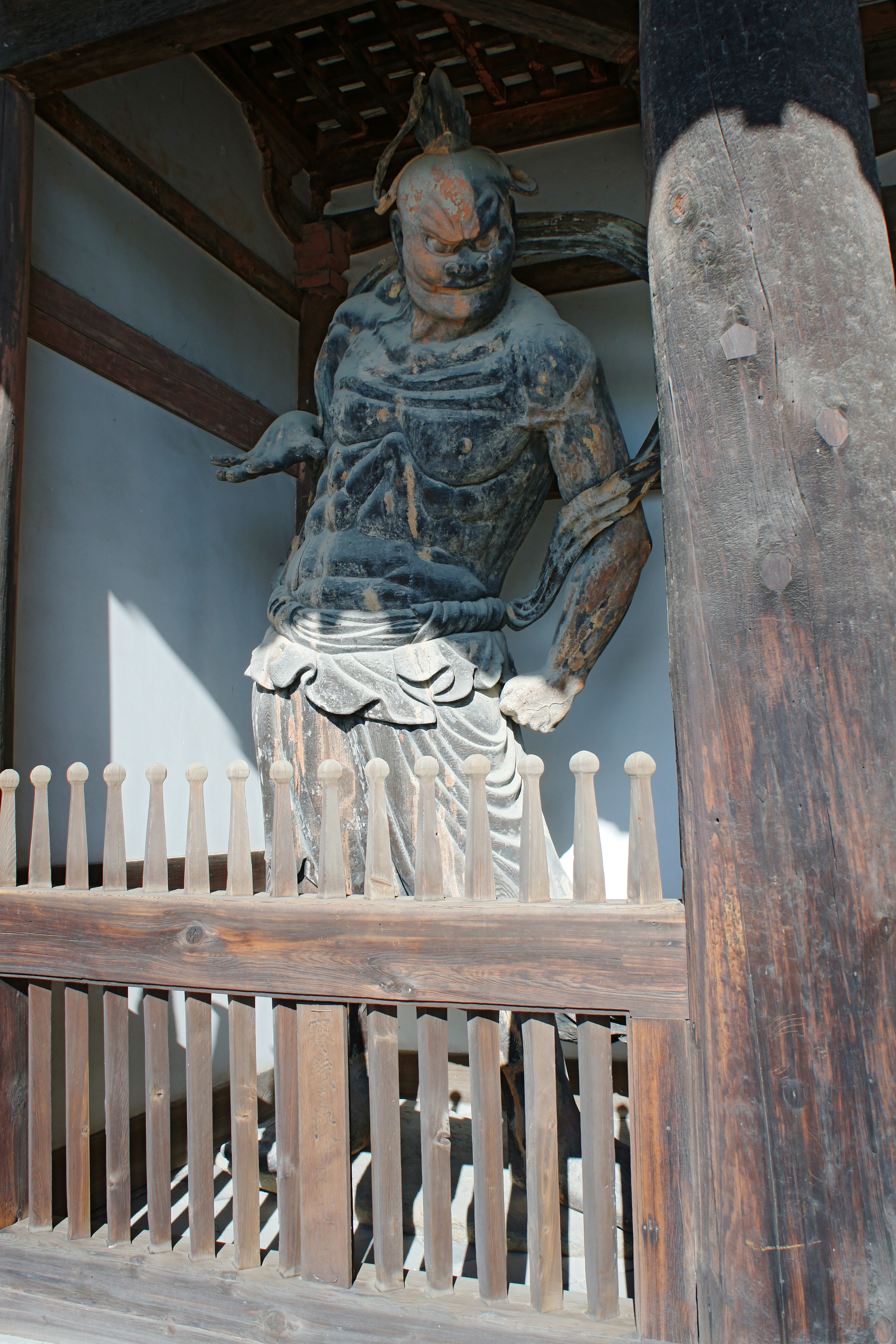
Naraen Kongō

== See also ==
- Mon (architecture)
