= Nijūmon =

Type of gate in a Shinto shrine

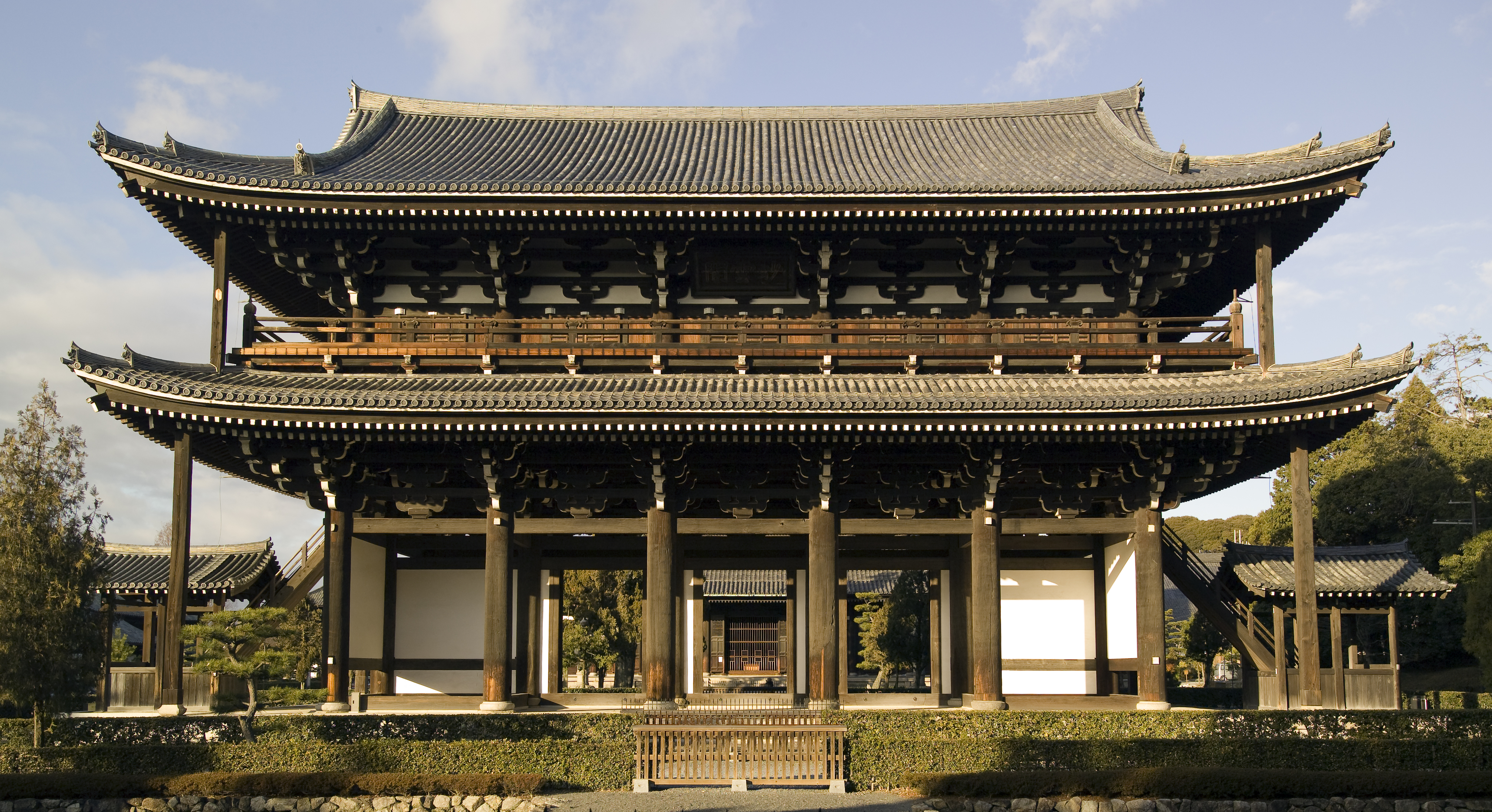
Nijūmon (the sanmon of Tōfuku-ji, a National Treasure)

Nijūmon (二重門; lit. 'two-story gate') is one of two types of two-story mons presently used in Japan (the other one being the rōmon) and can be found at most Japanese Buddhist temples. This gate is distinguishable from its relative by the roof above the first floor which skirts the entire upper story, absent in a rōmon. Accordingly, it has a series of brackets (tokyō) supporting the roof's eaves both at the first and at the second story. In a rōmon, the brackets support a balcony. The tokyō are usually three-stepped (mitesaki) with tail rafters at the third step. A nijūmon is normally covered by a hip-and-gable roof.

Unlike a rōmon, whose second story is inaccessible and unusable, a nijūmon has stairs leading to the second story. Some gates have at their ends two sanrō (山廊), 2 x 1 bay structures housing the stairs. The second story of a nijūmon usually contains statues of Shakyamuni or of goddess Kannon, and of the 16 Rakan, and hosts periodical religious ceremonies. Large nijūmon are 5 bays wide, 2 bays deep and have three entrances, however Tokyo's Zōjō-ji, the Tokugawa clan's funerary temple, has a gate which is 5 x 3 bays. Smaller ones are 3 x 2 bays and have one, two or even three entrances.

Of all temple gate types, the nujūmon has the highest status, and is accordingly used for important gates like the chūmon (middle gate) of ancient temples as Hōryū-ji. The sanmon, the gate of a Zen temple of highest prestige, is usually a nijūmon. (Note: The term sanmon originated at Zen temples, but is often used by other sects too, particularly by the Jōdo sect.) Some nijūmon are called chūmon (中門; lit. middle gate) because they are situated between the entrance and the temple.

== Gallery ==
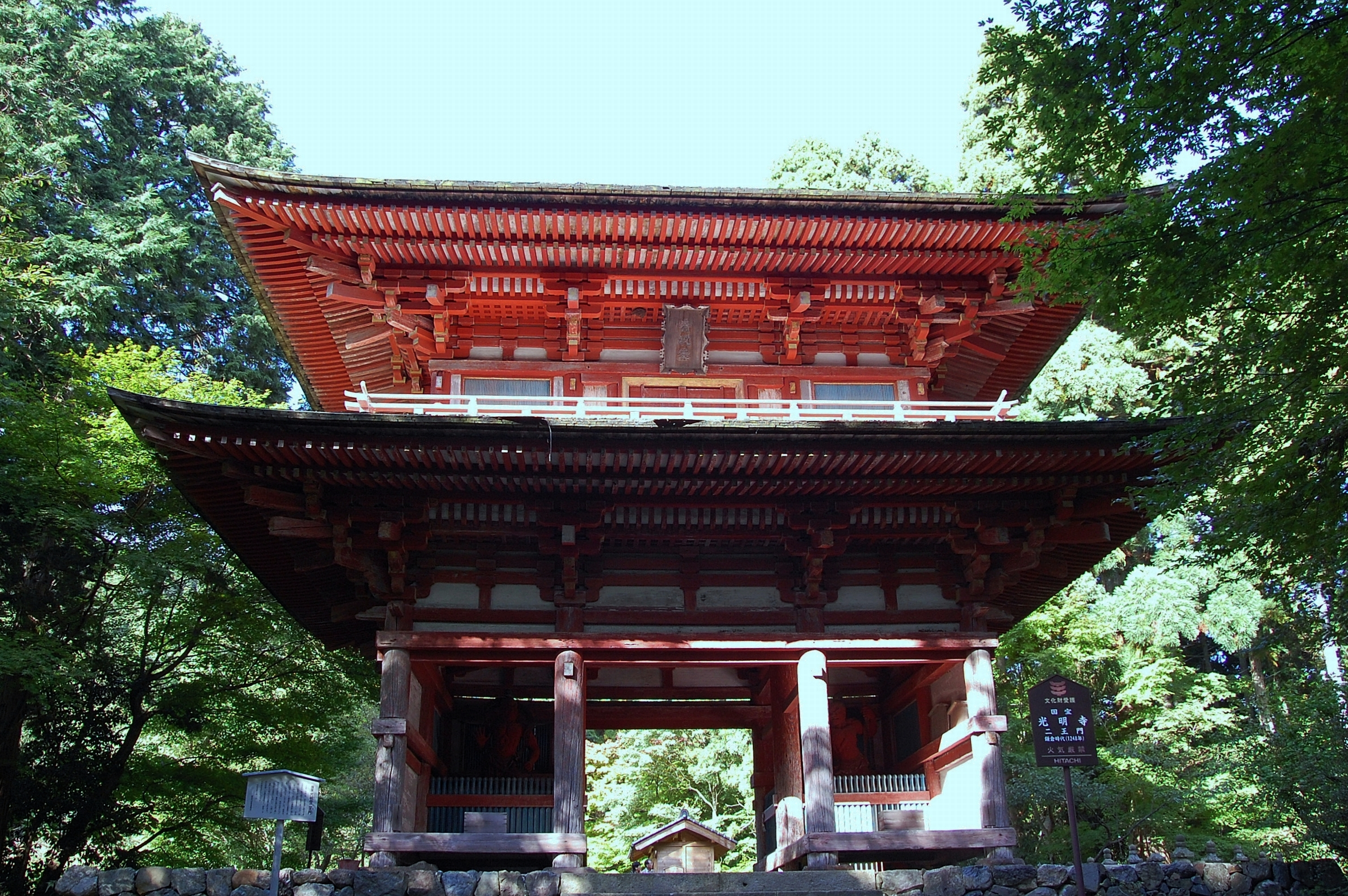
The Niōmon of Kōmyō-ji in Ayabe (National Treasure)

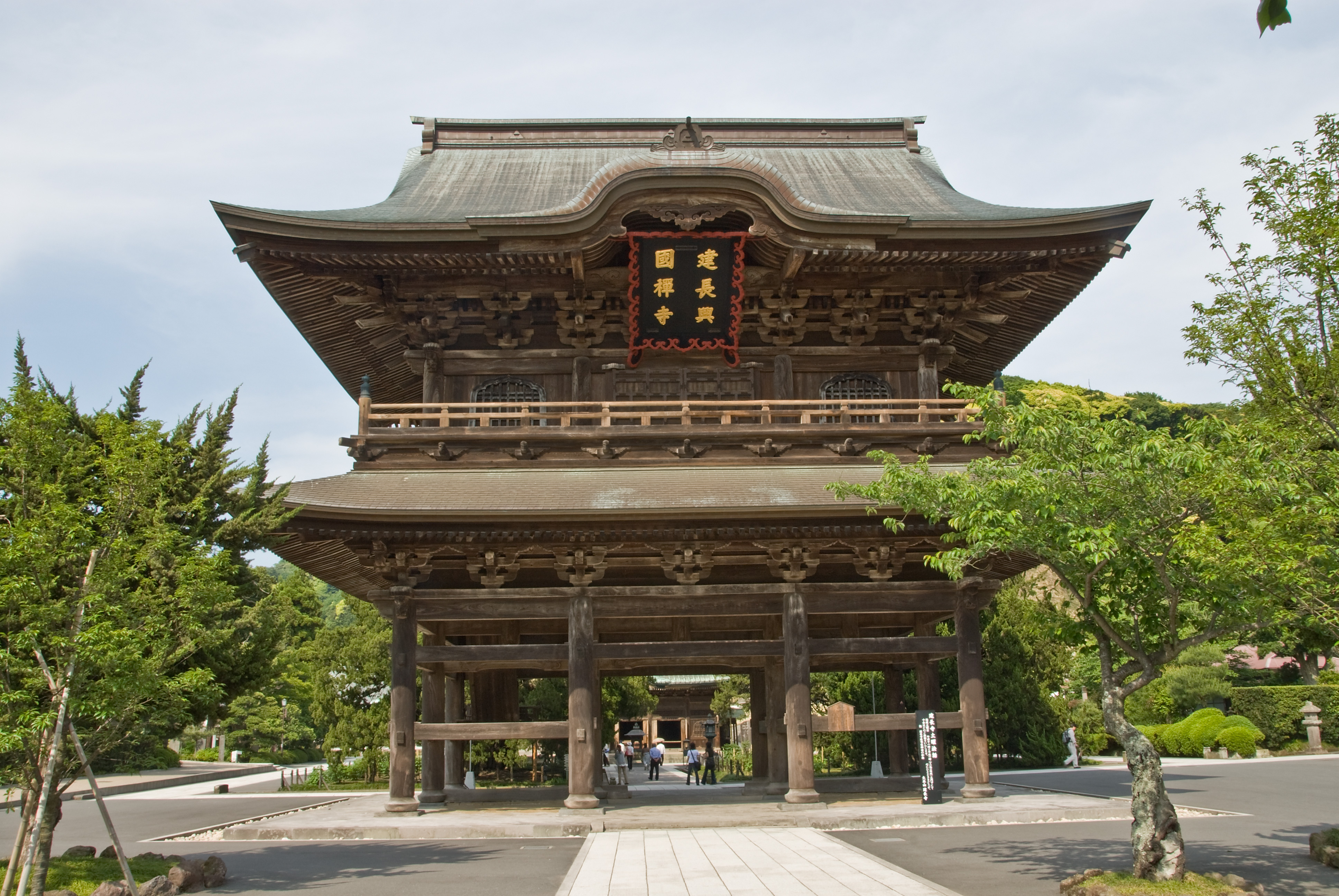
A nijūmon. Note the double roof.

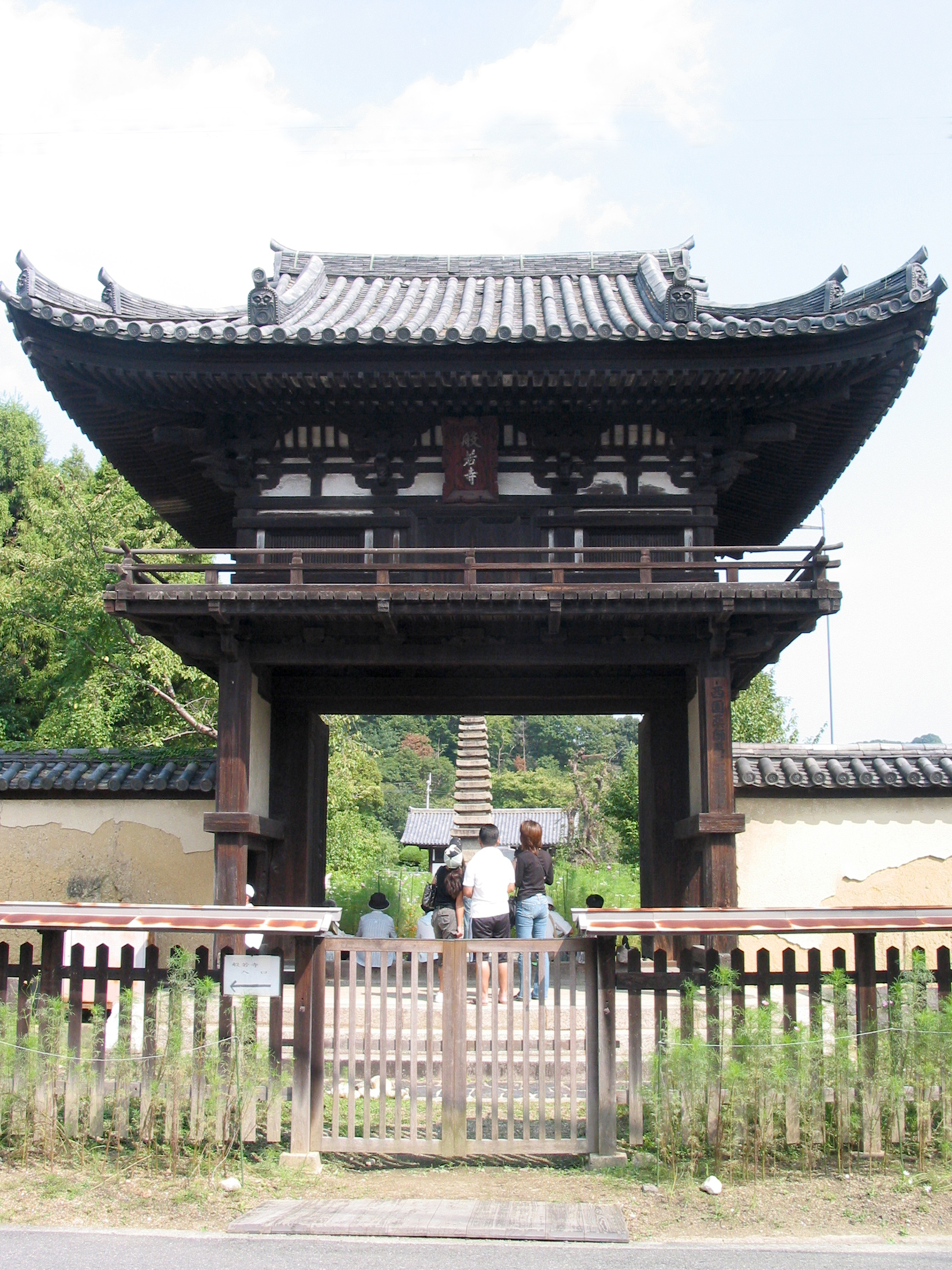
A rōmon. Note the balcony and the single roof.

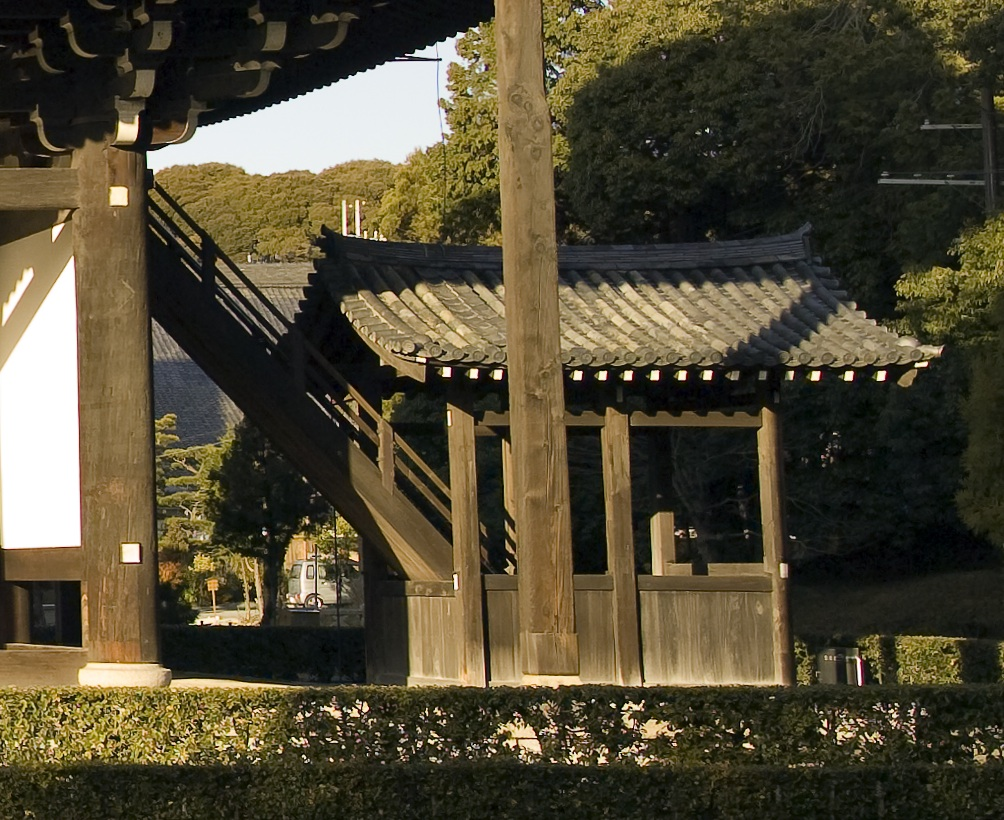
One of the sanrō of Tōfuku-ji's sanmon (detail of the photo above)

== Second story ==
Some interior images of the second story of a nijūmon, in this case Kōmyō-ji's sanmon in Kamakura, Kanagawa prefecture.

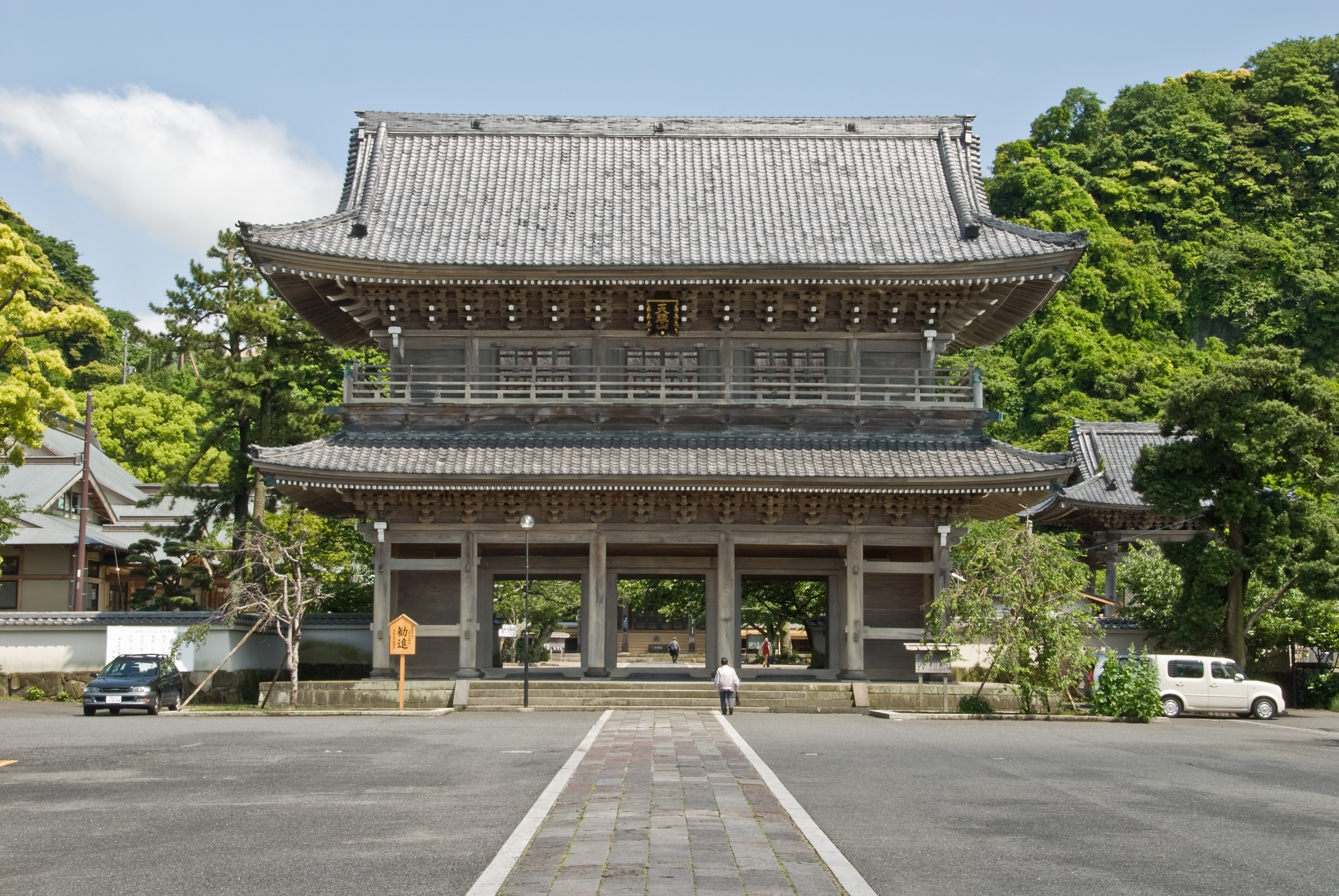
The sanmon

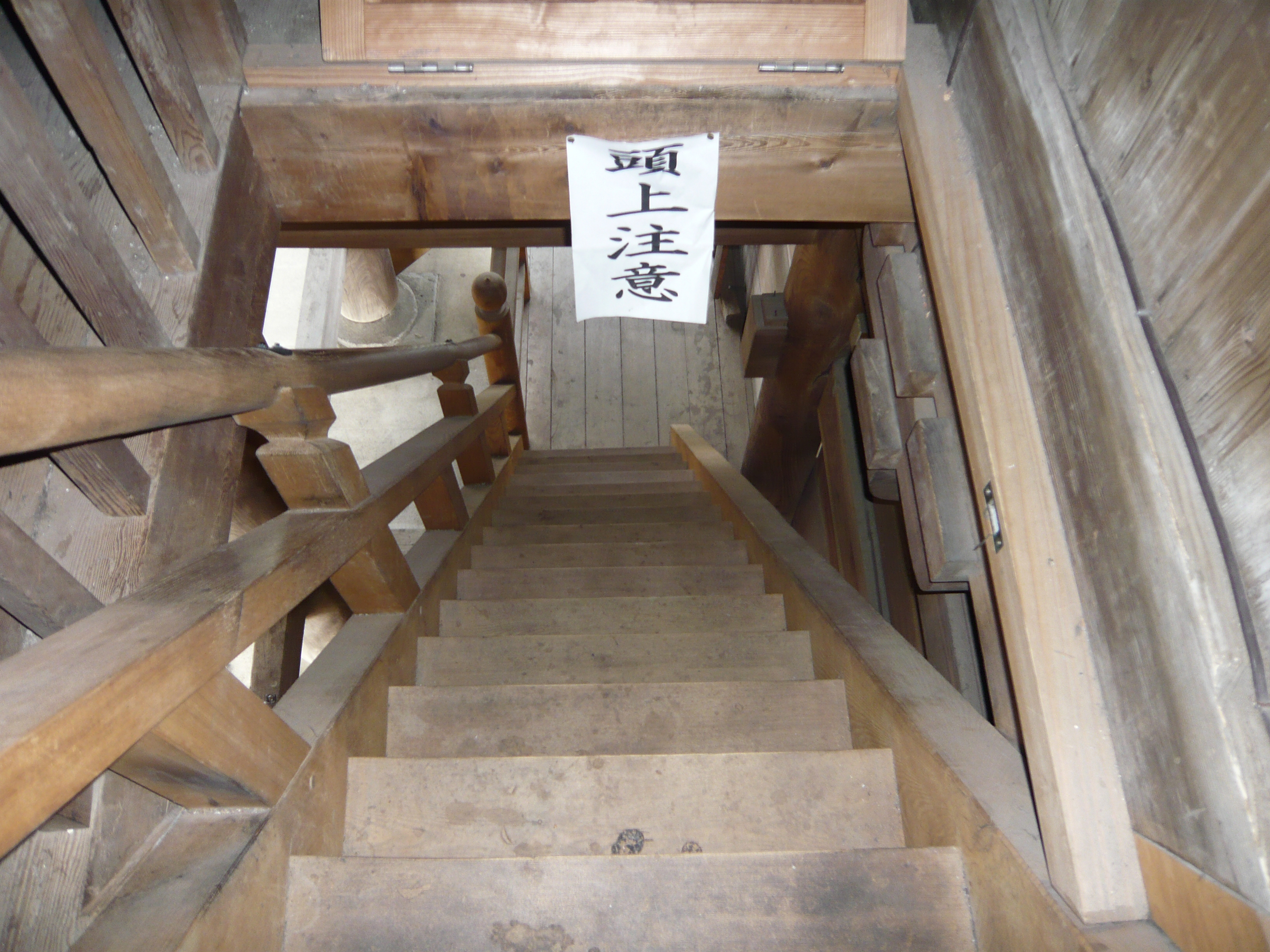
The stairs to the second story

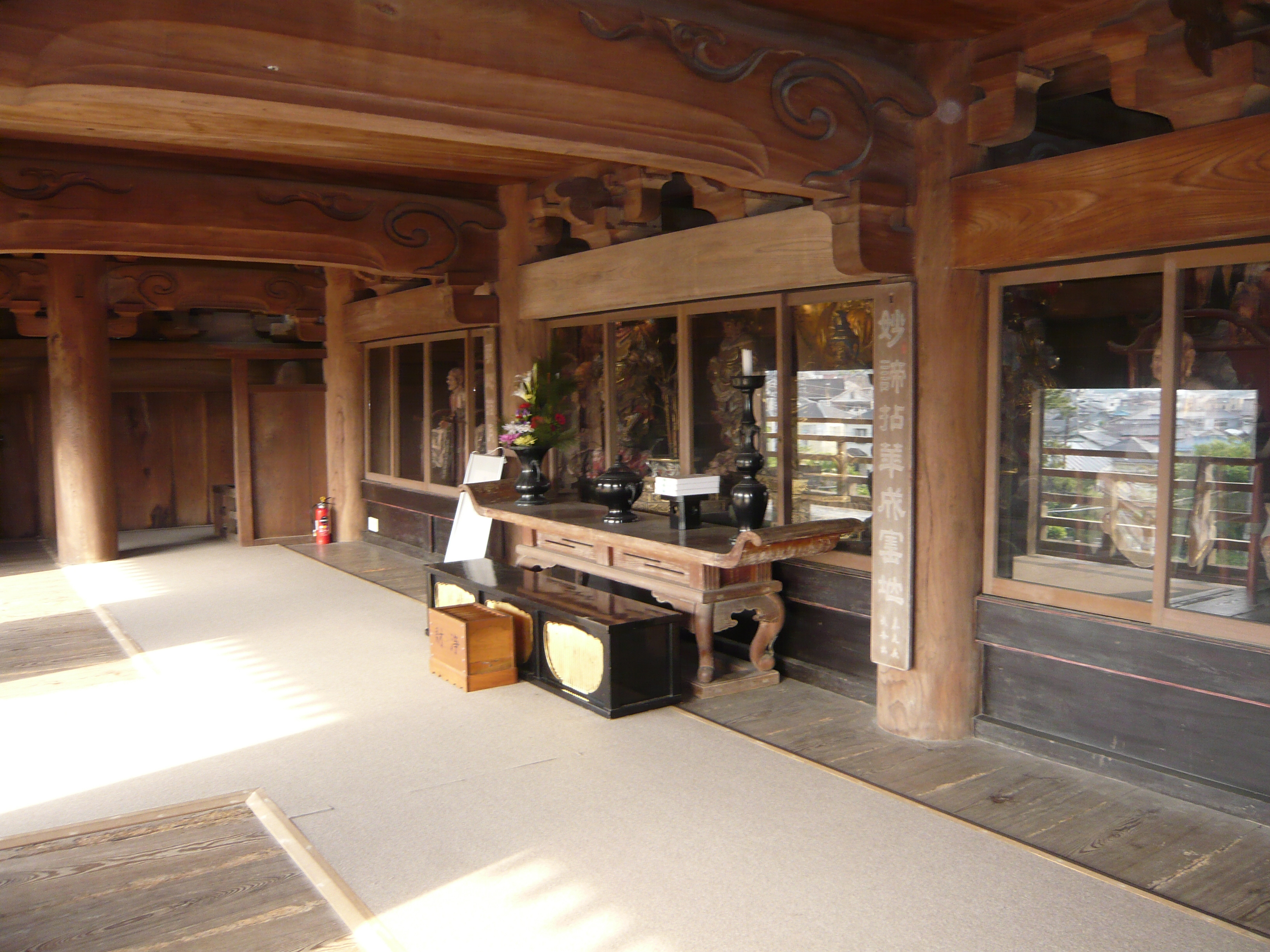
The second story

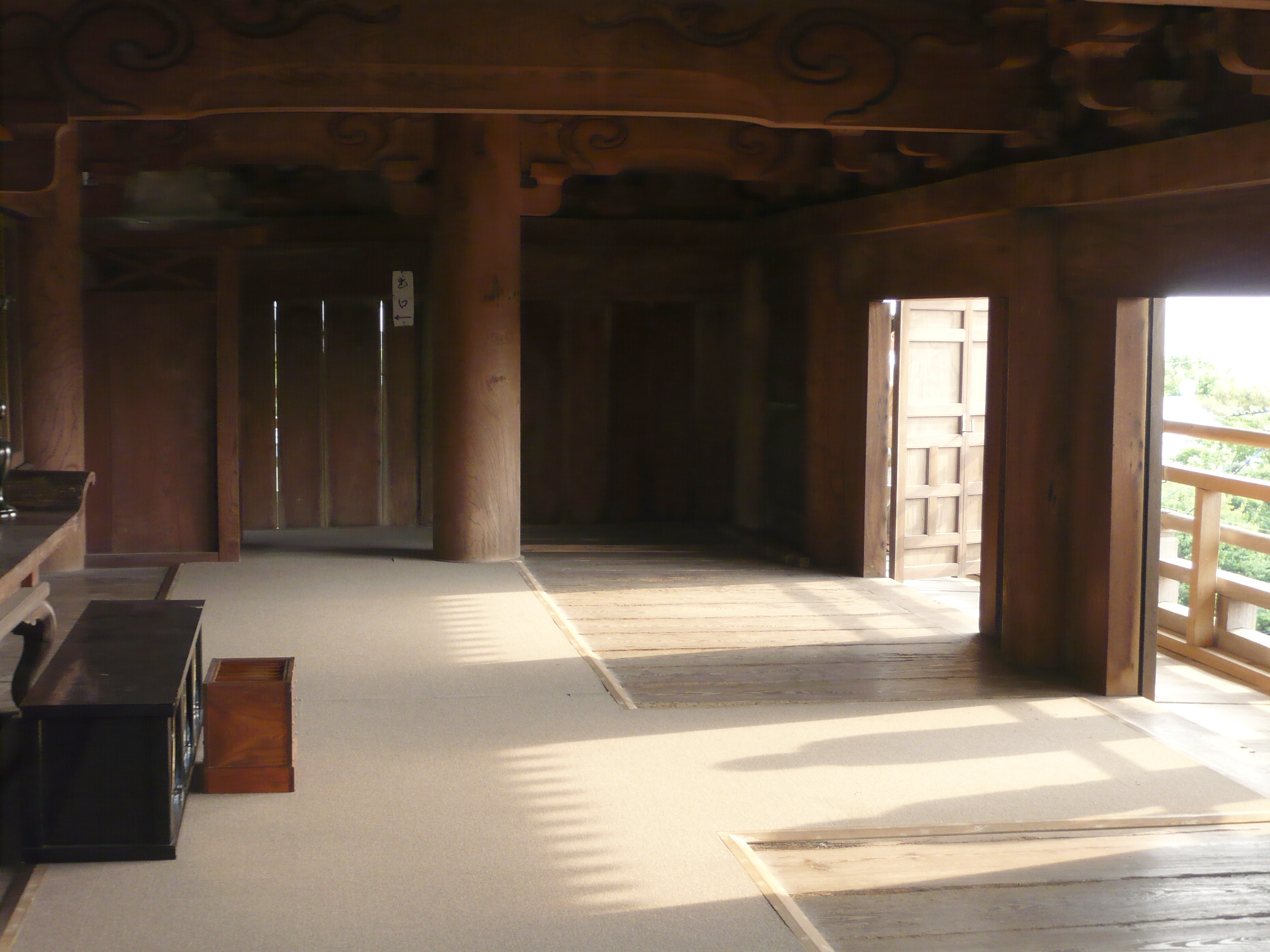
Second story, exit to the balcony

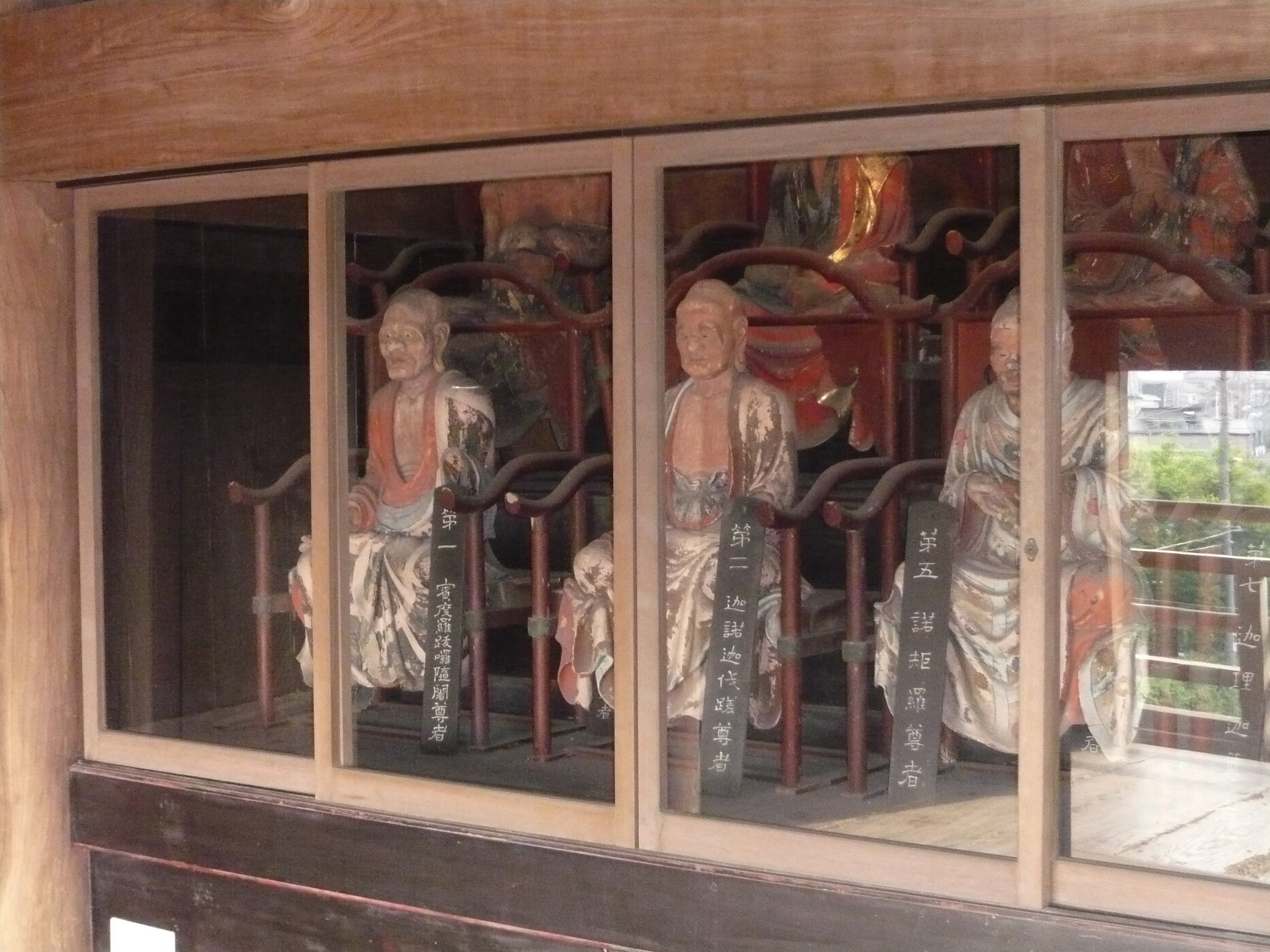
Sacred images in the main room

== Bibliography ==
- Iwanami Nihonshi Jiten (岩波日本史辞典), CD-Rom Version. Iwanami Shoten, 1999-2001 (in Japanese)
- "Nijuumon". JAANUS – Japanese Architecture and Art Net User System.
- Fujita Masaya, Koga Shūsaku, ed. (April 10, 1990). Nihon Kenchiku-shi (in Japanese) (September 30, 2008 ed.). Shōwa-dō. ISBN 4-8122-9805-9.
