= Mon (architecture) =

Japanese term for gate

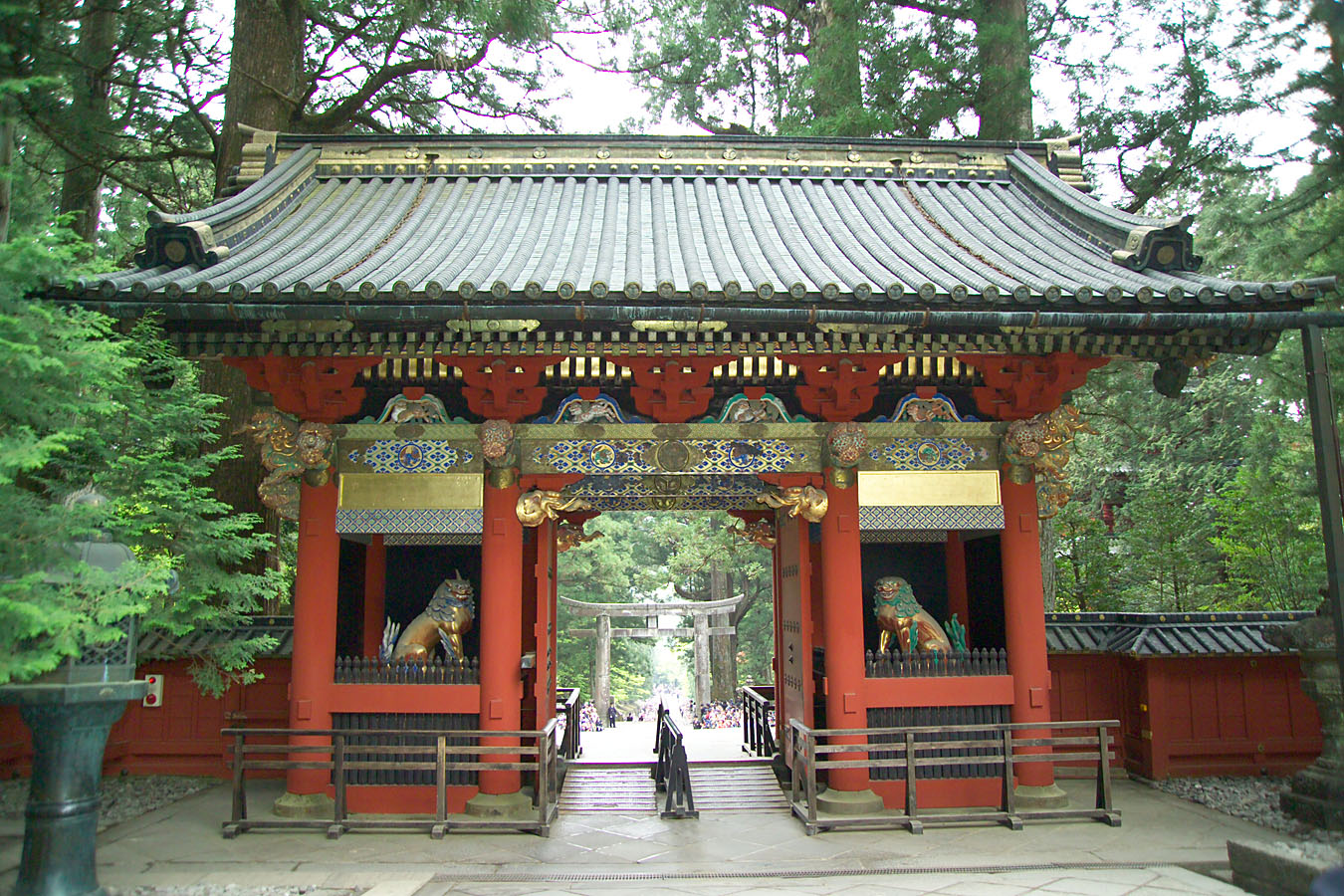
Nikkō Tōshō-gū's omote-mon (front gate) structurally is a hakkyakumon (eight-legged gate).

Mon (門, 'gate') is a generic Japanese term for gate often used, either alone or as a suffix, in referring to the many gates used by Buddhist temples, Shinto shrines and traditional-style buildings and castles.

== Significance ==
Unlike gates of secular buildings, most temple and shrine gates are purely symbolic elements of liminality, as they cannot be completely closed and just mark the transition between the mundane and the sacred. In many cases, for example that of the sanmon, a temple gate has purifying, cleansing properties.

== Description ==
Gate size is measured in ken, where a ken is the interval between two pillars of a traditional-style building. A temple's rōmon for example can have dimensions from a maximum of 5x2 ken to a more common 3x2 ken, down to even one ken. The word is usually translated in English as "bay" and is better understood as an indication of proportions than as a unit of measurement.

Like the temples they belong to, gates can be in the wayō, daibutsuyō, zen'yō or setchūyō style. They can be named after:

- Their location, as the chūmon (中門; lit. 'intermediate gate') or of the omotemon (表門; lit. 'front gate') or the karametemon (搦手門; lit. 'back entrance gate').
- The deity they house, as the Niōmon (lit. "Niō gate", see below), a gate enshrining two gods called Niō in its outer bays.
- Their structure or shape, as the nijūmon (lit. "two-story gate", see below) and the rōmon (lit. 'tower gate').
- Their function, as the sanmon (see below), which is the most important gate of a Zen or Jōdo temple.

Not all such terms are mutually exclusive and the same gate may be called with different names according to the situation. For example, a Niōmon can also be correctly called a nijūmon if it has two stories.

== Variations ==
Very different structurally from the others is the toriimon (normally called simply torii), a two-legged gate in stone or wood regularly associated with Shinto, but common also within Japanese Buddhist temples. As prominent a temple as Osaka's Shitennō-ji, founded in 593 by Shōtoku Taishi and the oldest state-built Buddhist temple in the country, has a torii straddling one of its entrances. The origins of the torii are unknown; although several theories on the subject exist, none has gained universal acceptance. Because the use of symbolic gates is widespread in Asia—such structures can be found for example in India, China, Vietnam, Thailand, Korea, and within Nicobarese and Shompen villages—historians believe it may be an imported tradition. It most often symbolically marks the entrance of a Shinto shrine. For this reason, it is never closed.

== Common types ==
- Hakkyakumon or Yatsuashimon (八脚門; eight-legged gate) – so called because of its eight secondary pillars, which support four main pillars standing under the gate's ridge. It therefore really has twelve pillars altogether.
- Heijūmon (塀重門) – A gate in a wall consisting in just two square posts.
- Kabukimon (冠木門) – A gate in a wall formed by two square posts and a horizontal beam.
- Karamon (唐門; Chinese gate) – A gate characterized by a karahafu, an undulating bargeboard peculiar to Japan. Karamon are used at Japanese castles, Buddhist temples and Shinto shrines.
- Kōraimon (高麗門; lit. 'Korean gate') – Used at castles, temples and daimyō residences, it consists of a tiled, gabled roof on two pillars, plus two smaller roofs over the secondary pillars (控柱, hikaebashira) on the rear of the gate.
- Masugata (枡形). A defensive structure consisting in a courtyard along the wall of a castle with two gates set at a square angle, one giving access to the castle and one facing the outside. The external gate is typically a kōraimon, the internal one a yaguramon. The Sakuradamon at Tokyo's Imperial Palace is such a gate.
- Munamon (棟門) – A gate formed by two pillars sustaining a gabled roof. Similar to a kōraimon, but lacking the roofed secondary pillars.
- Nagayamon (長屋門) lit. nagaya gate – A nagaya, literally a long house, was a row house where low status samurai used to live, and the nagayamon was a gate that allowed traffic from one side of the structure to the other.
- Nijūmon – A two-storied gate with a pent roof between the two stories. Distinguishable from the similar rōmon for having a pent roof between stories.
- Niōmon – A gate enshrining in its two outer bays the statues of two warden gods, the Niō.
- Rōmon – A two-storied, single roofed gate where the second story is inaccessible and offers no usable room. Distinguishable from the similar nijūmon for not having a pent roof between stories.
- Sanmon – The most important gate of a Japanese Zen Buddhist temple. Also used by other schools, particularly the Jōdo. Its importance notwithstanding, the sanmon is not the first gate of the temple, and in fact it usually stands between the sōmon (outer gate) and the butsuden (lit. "Hall of Buddha", i.e. the main hall).
- Sōmon – the gate at the entrance of a temple. It often precedes the bigger and more important sanmon.
- Torii – This distinctive symbolic gate is usually associated with Shinto shrines; however, it is common at Buddhist temples too, as most have at least one.
- Uzumimon (埋門; lit. 'buried gate') – Gates opened in a castle wall. Because they were used to connect surfaces at different levels, they looked as if they were buried in the ground.
- Yaguramon (櫓門) – A gate with a yagura on top.
- Yakuimon (薬医門) – A gate having no pillars under the ridge of its gabled gate, and supported by four pillars at its corners.
- Shikyakumon or Yotsuashimon (四脚門; four-legged gate) – so called because of its four secondary pillars which support two main pillars standing under the gate's ridge. It therefore really has six pillars.

== Photo gallery ==
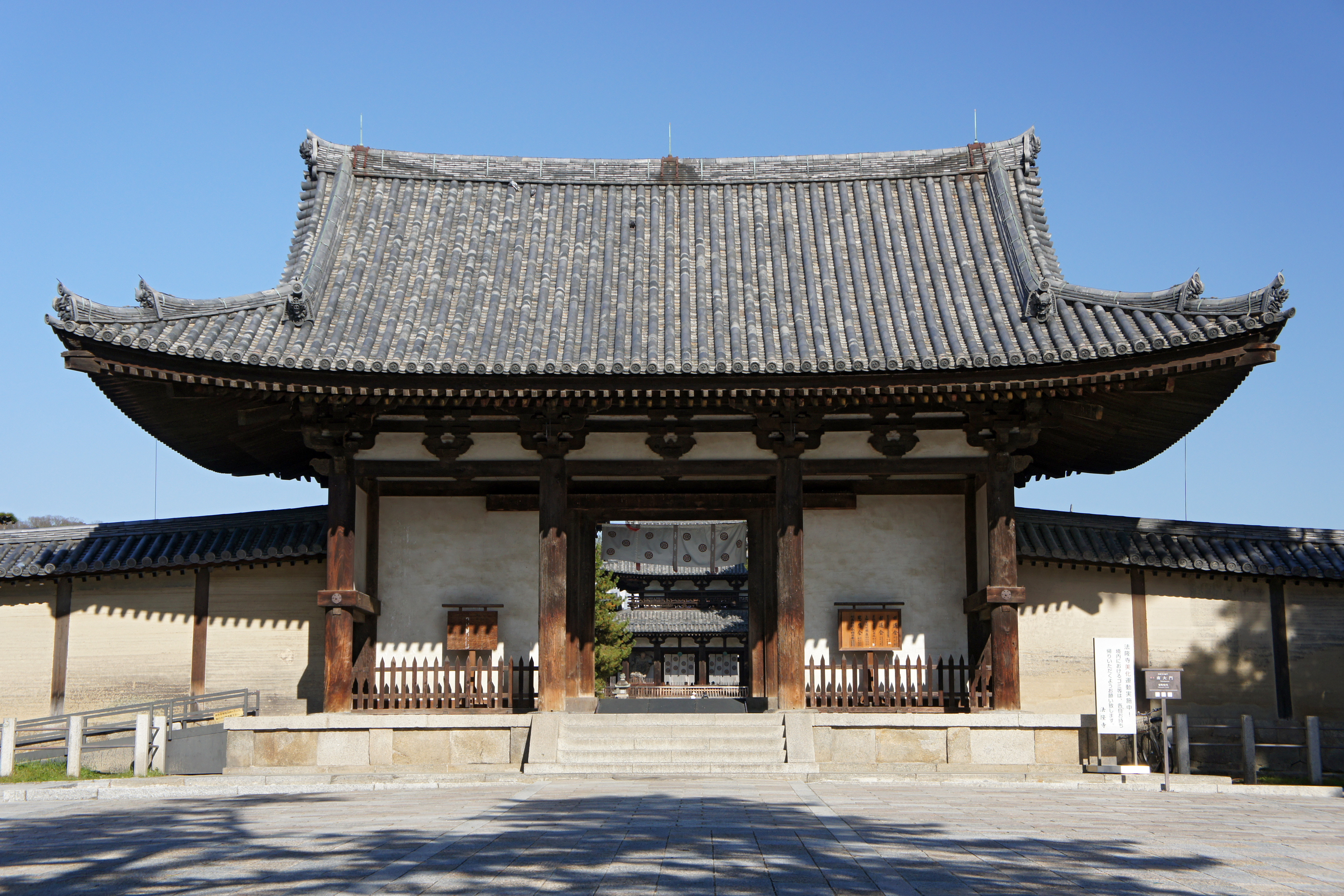
Hakkyakumon

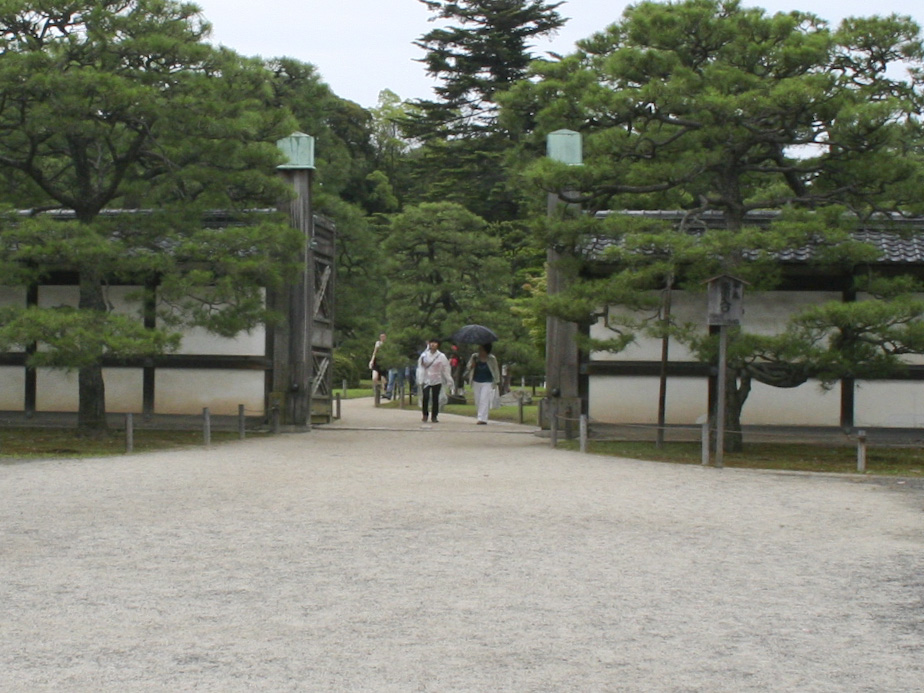
Heijūmon

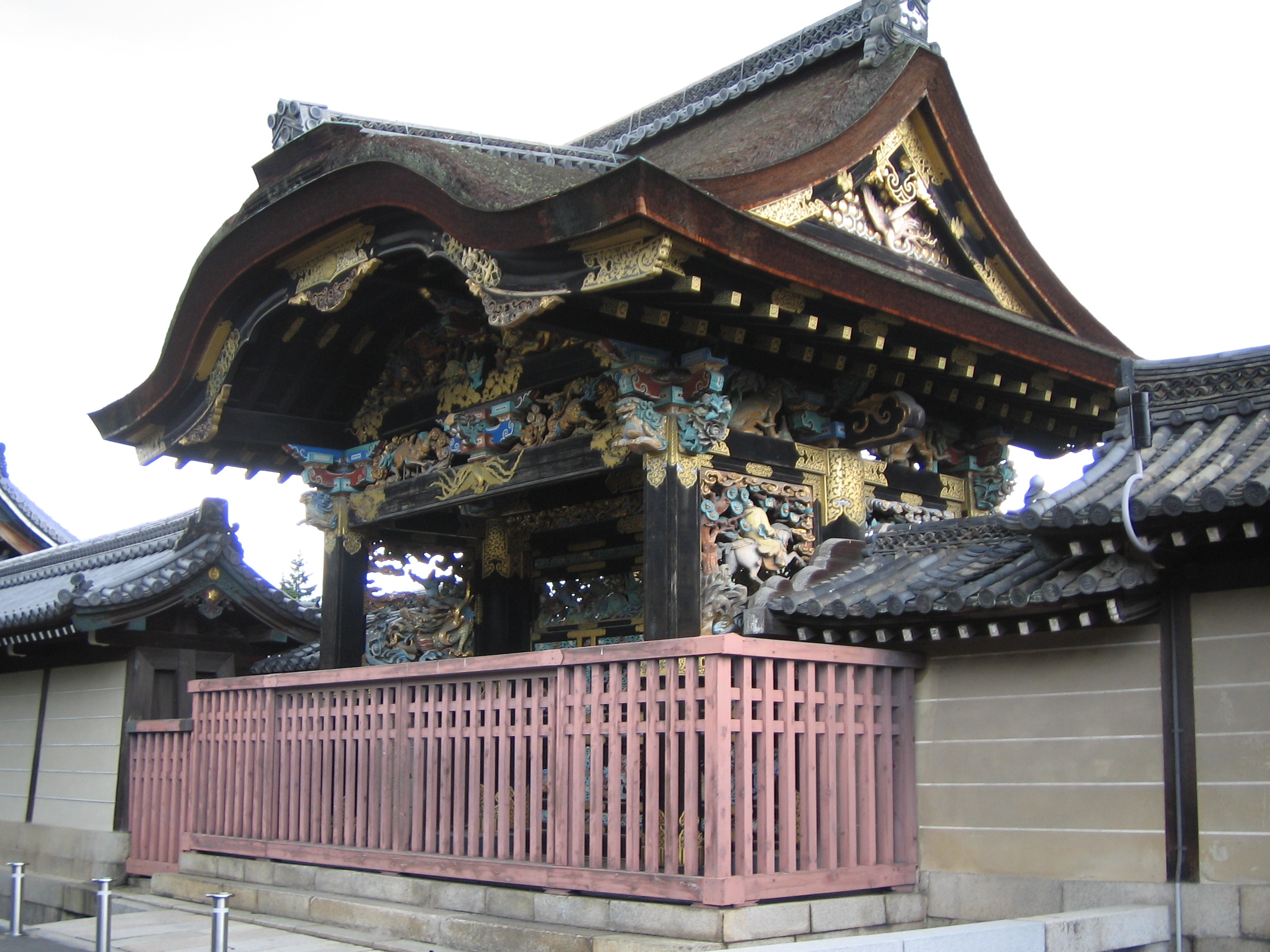
Karamon

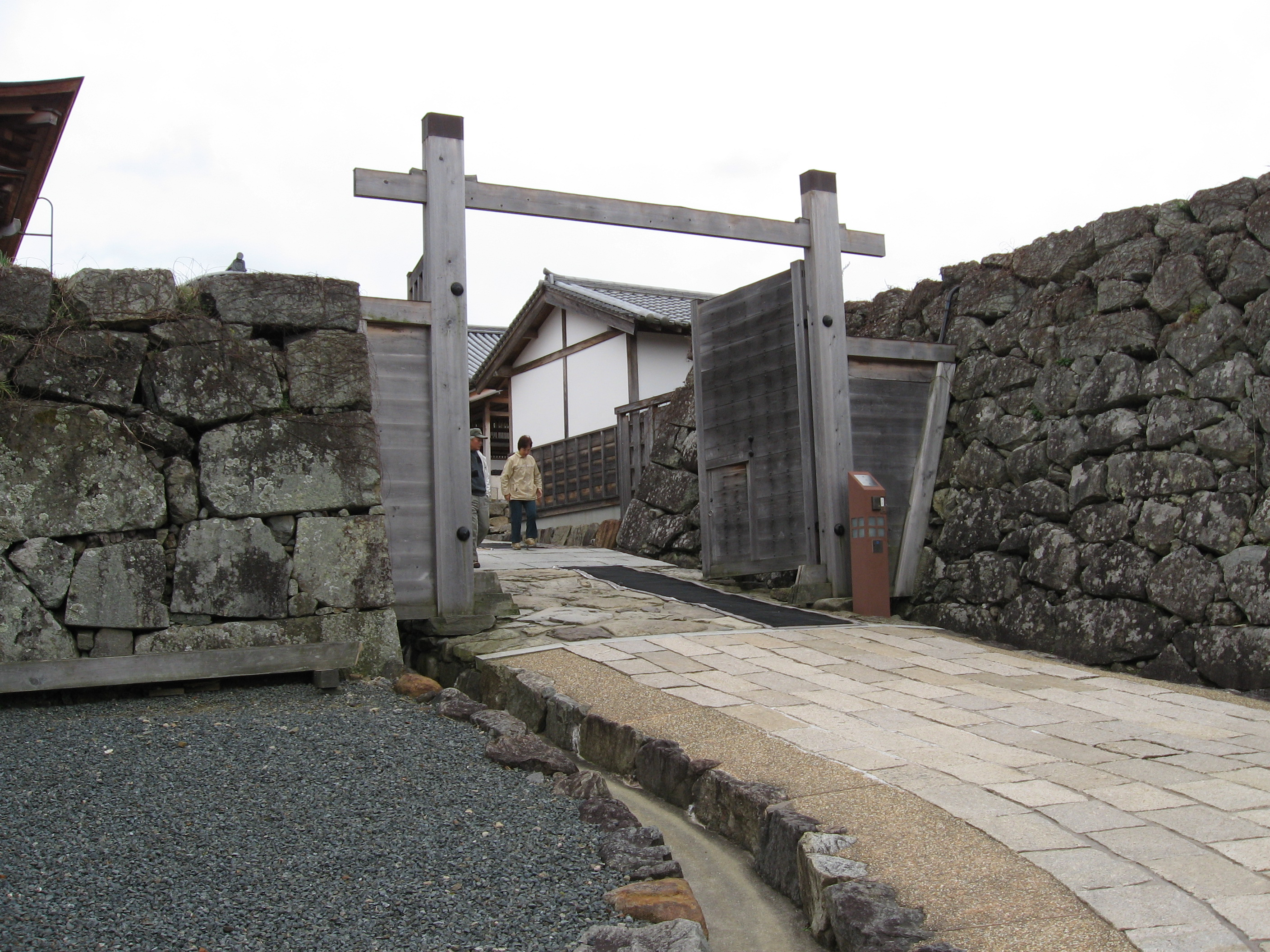
Kabukimon

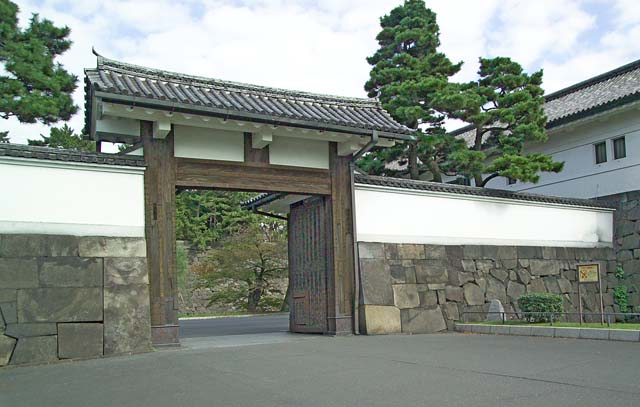
Kōraimon, outside

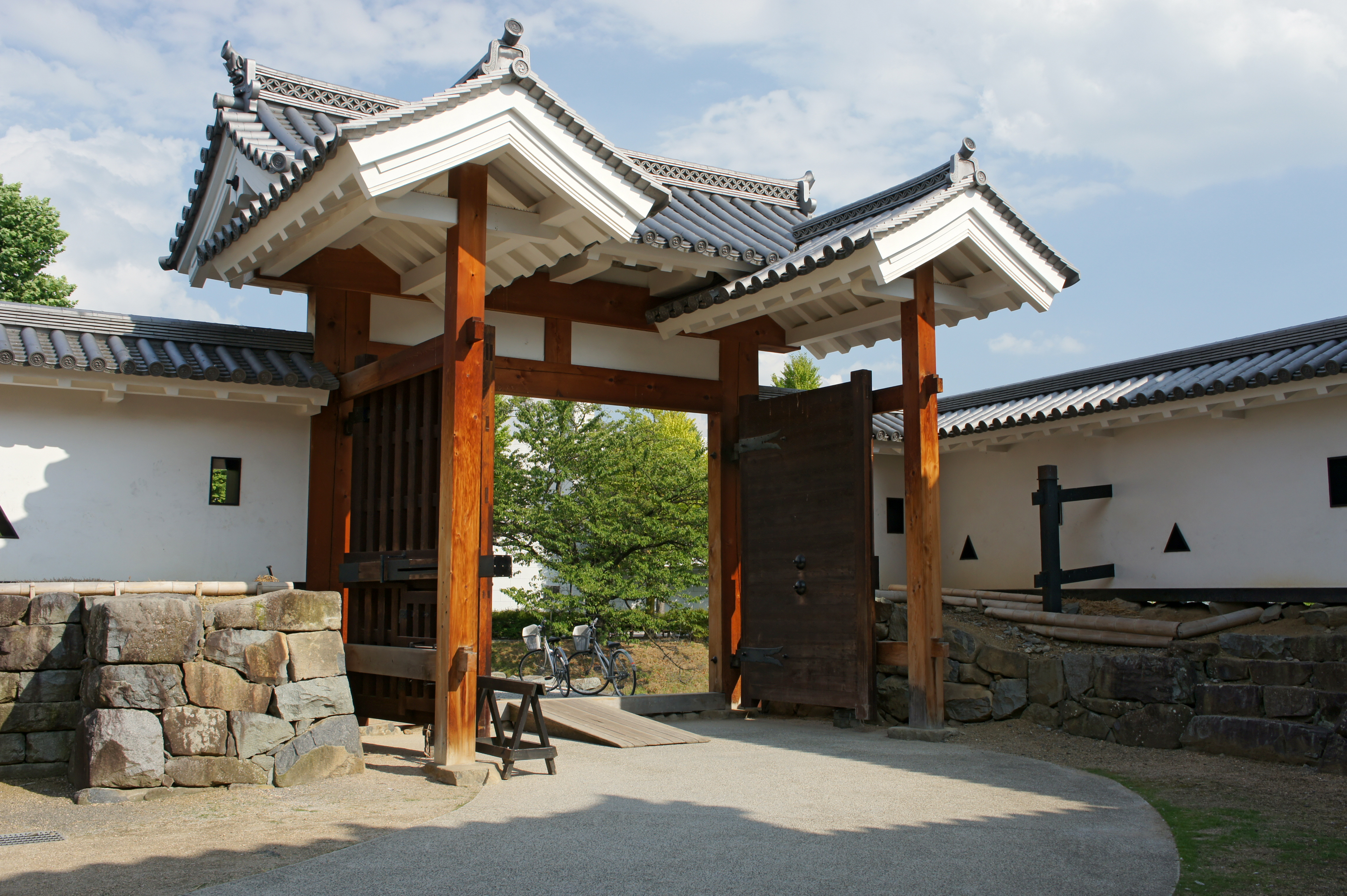
Kōraimon, inside

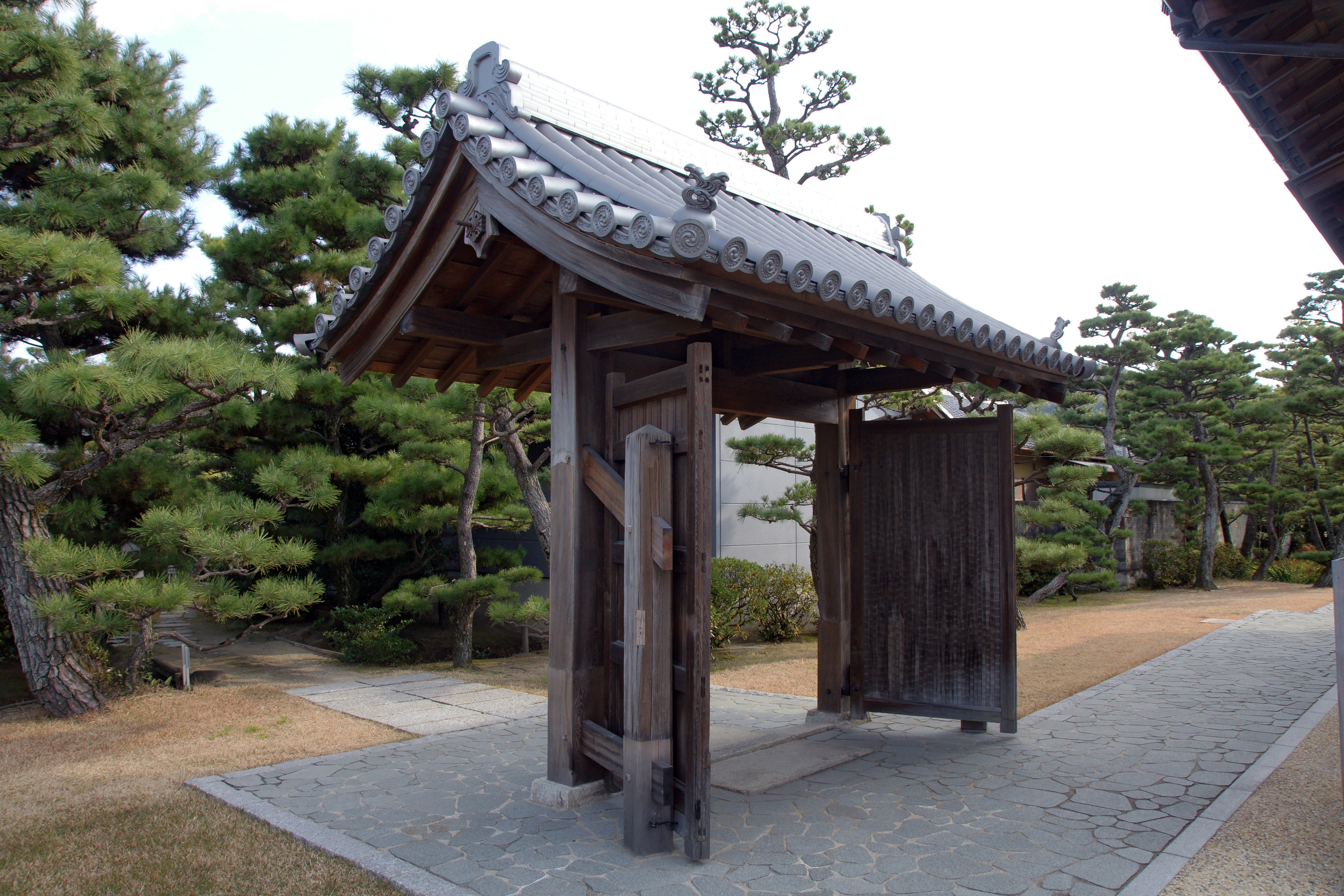
Munamon

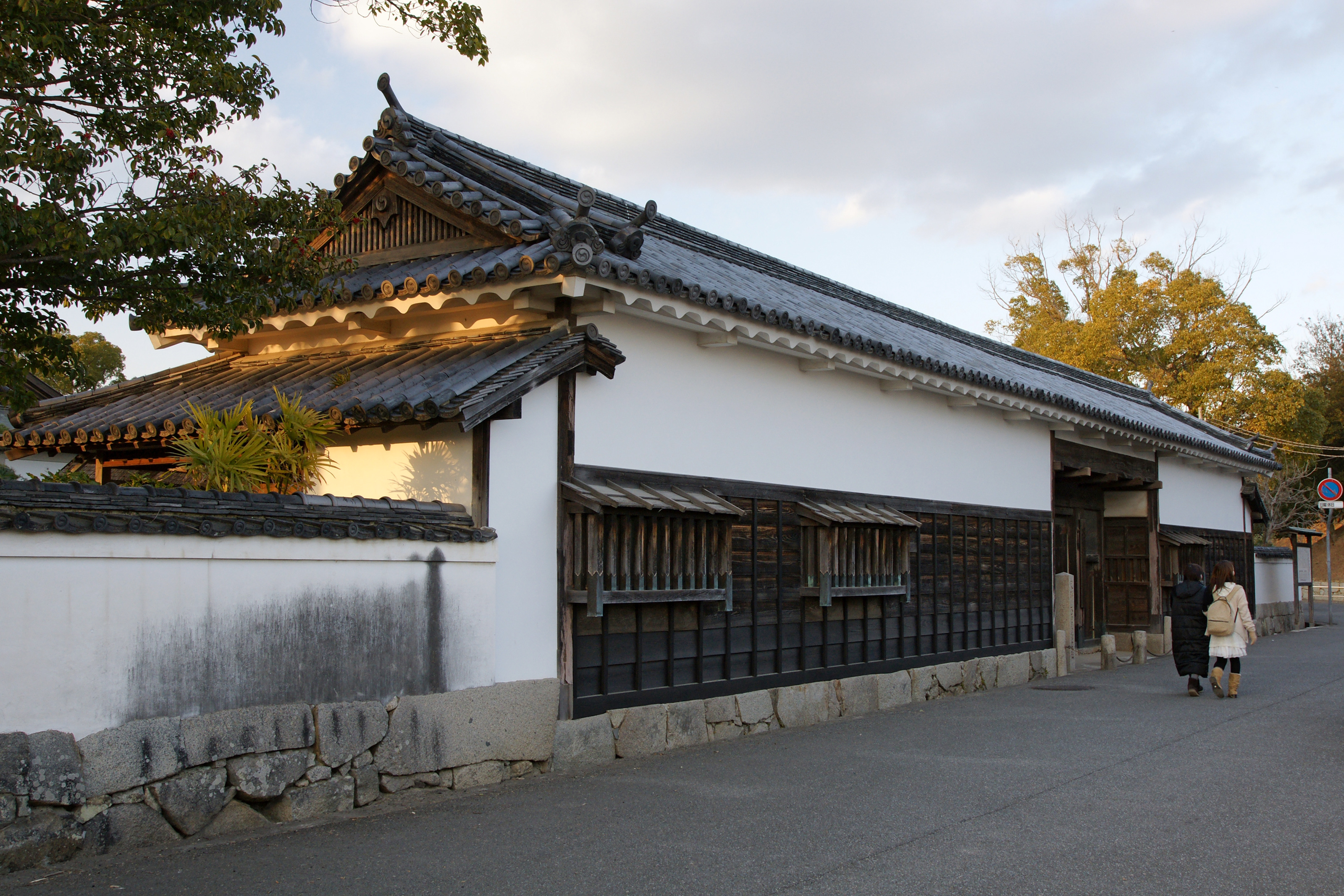
Nagayamon

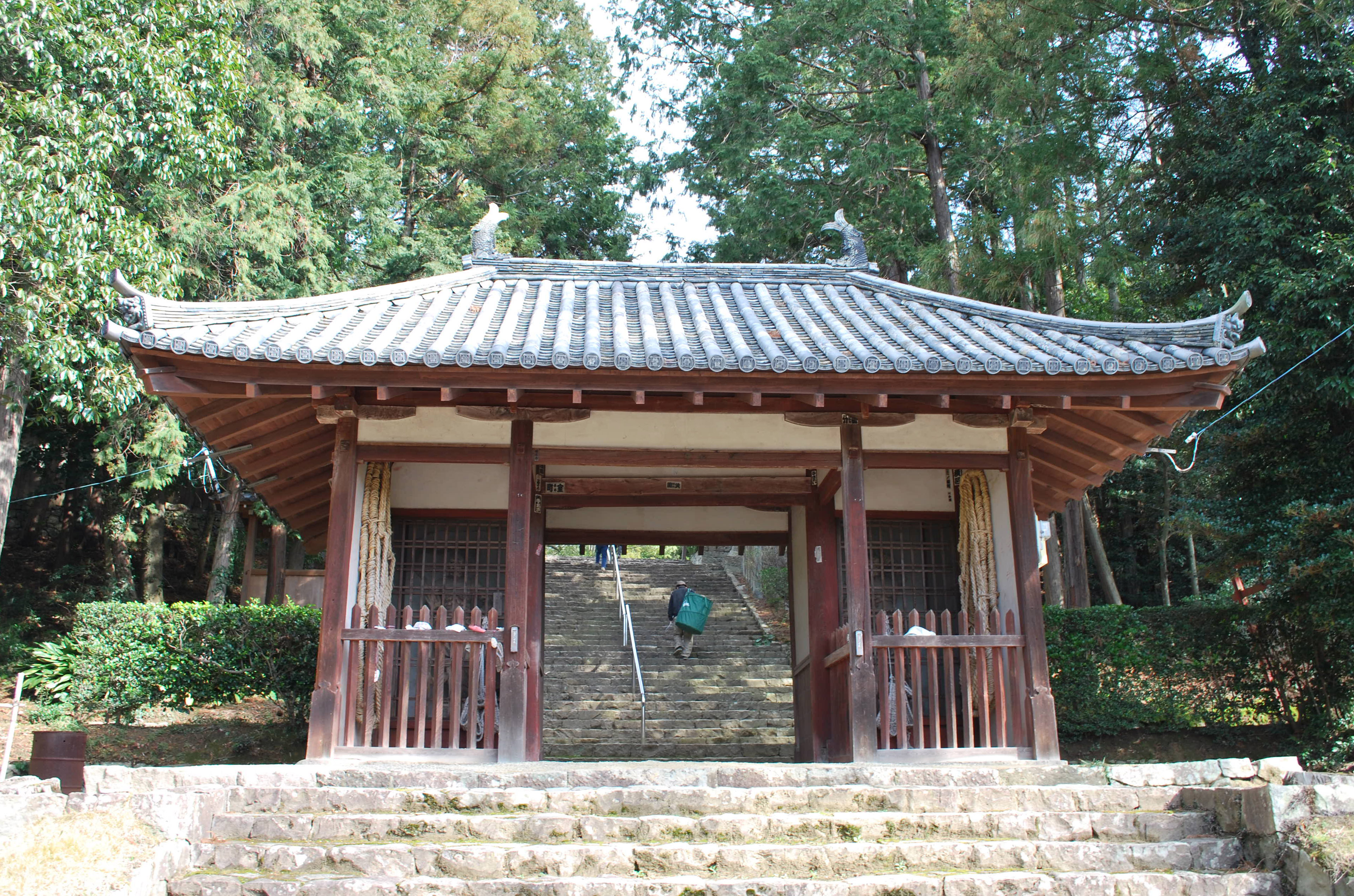
Niōmon

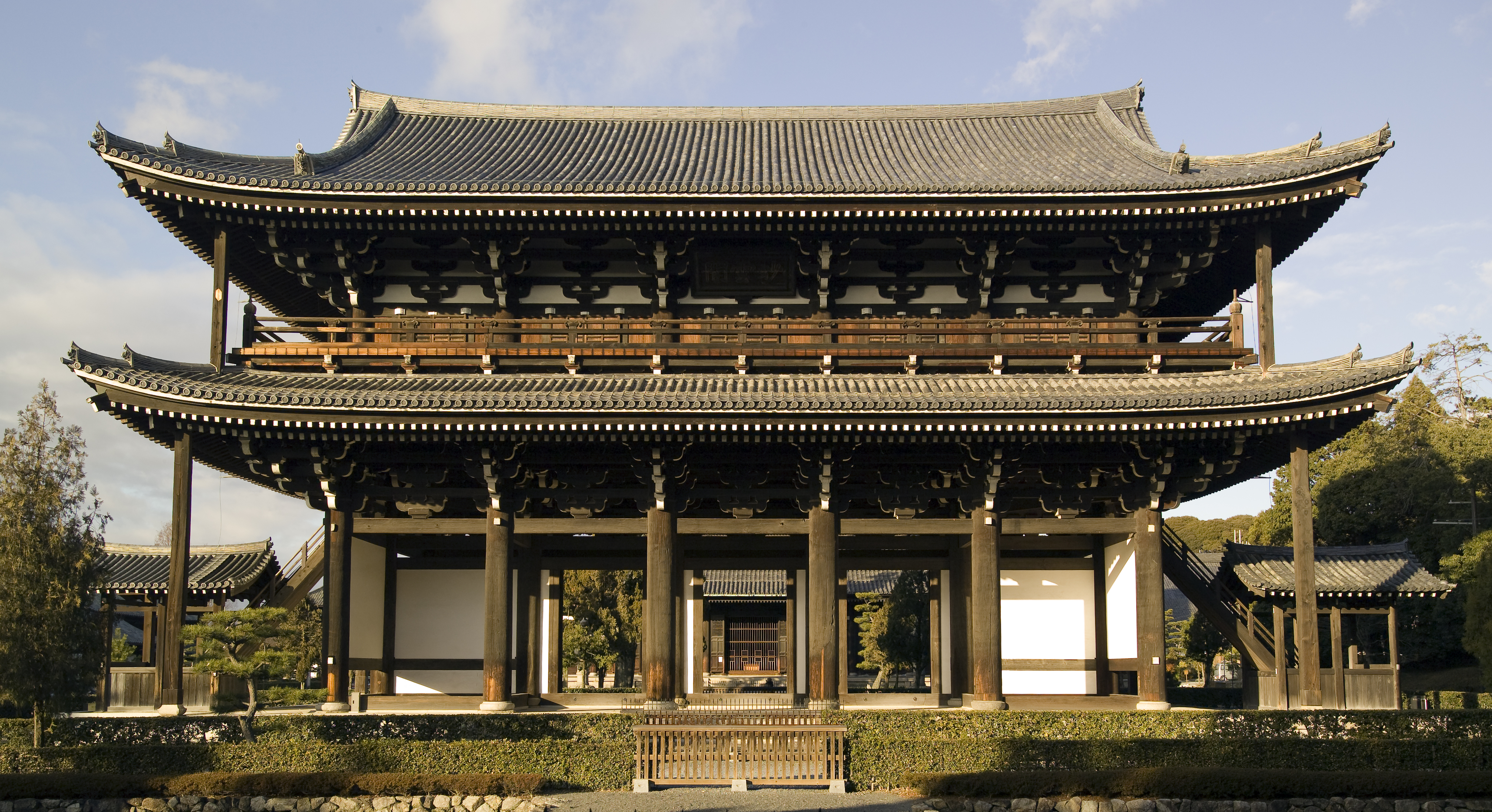
Tōfuku-ji's sanmon is a nijūmon.

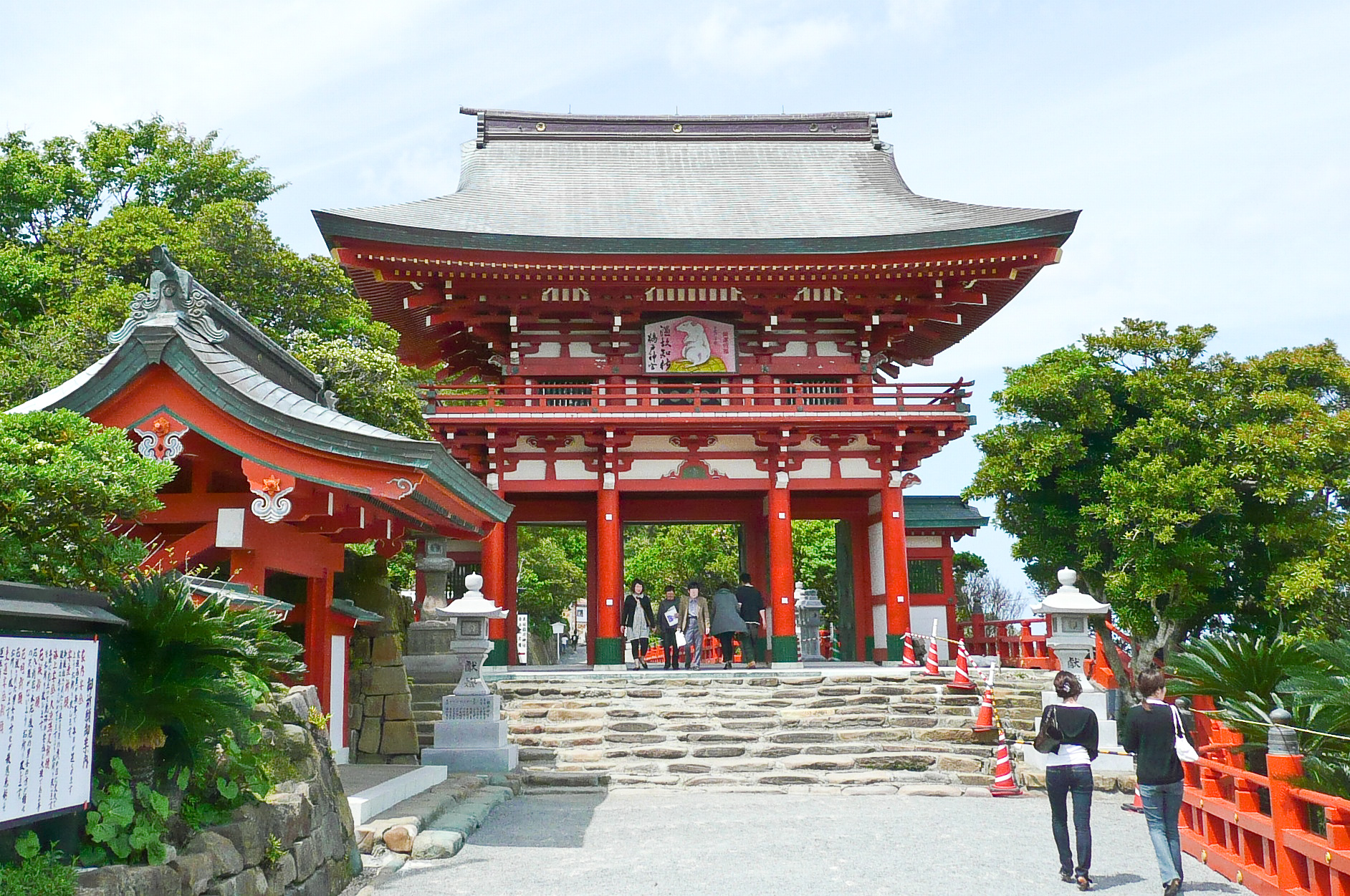
Rōmon. Note the absence of stairs to the second story.

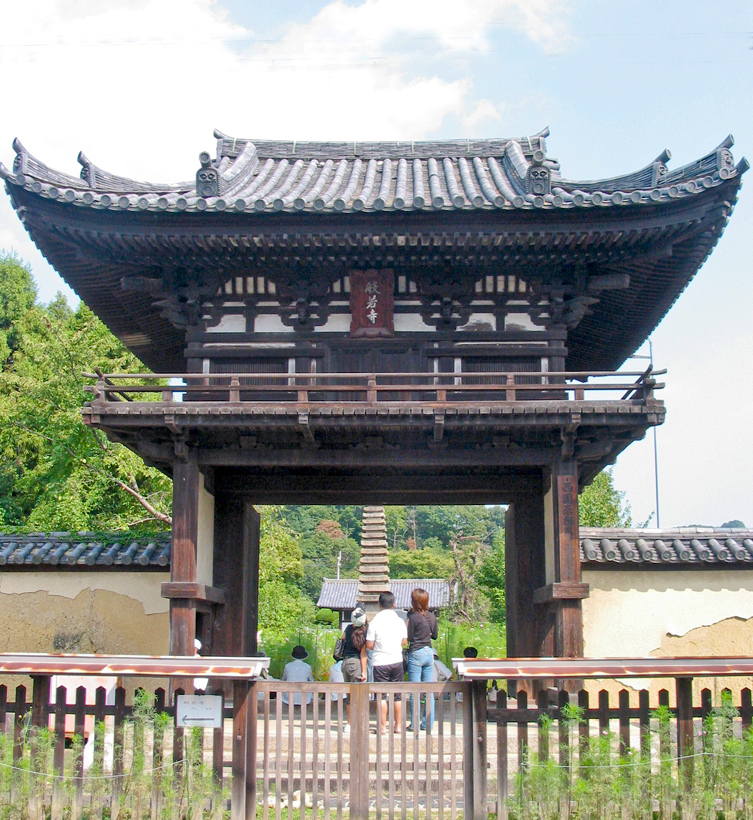
This shikyakumon is also a rōmon. Note the absence of stairs to the second story.

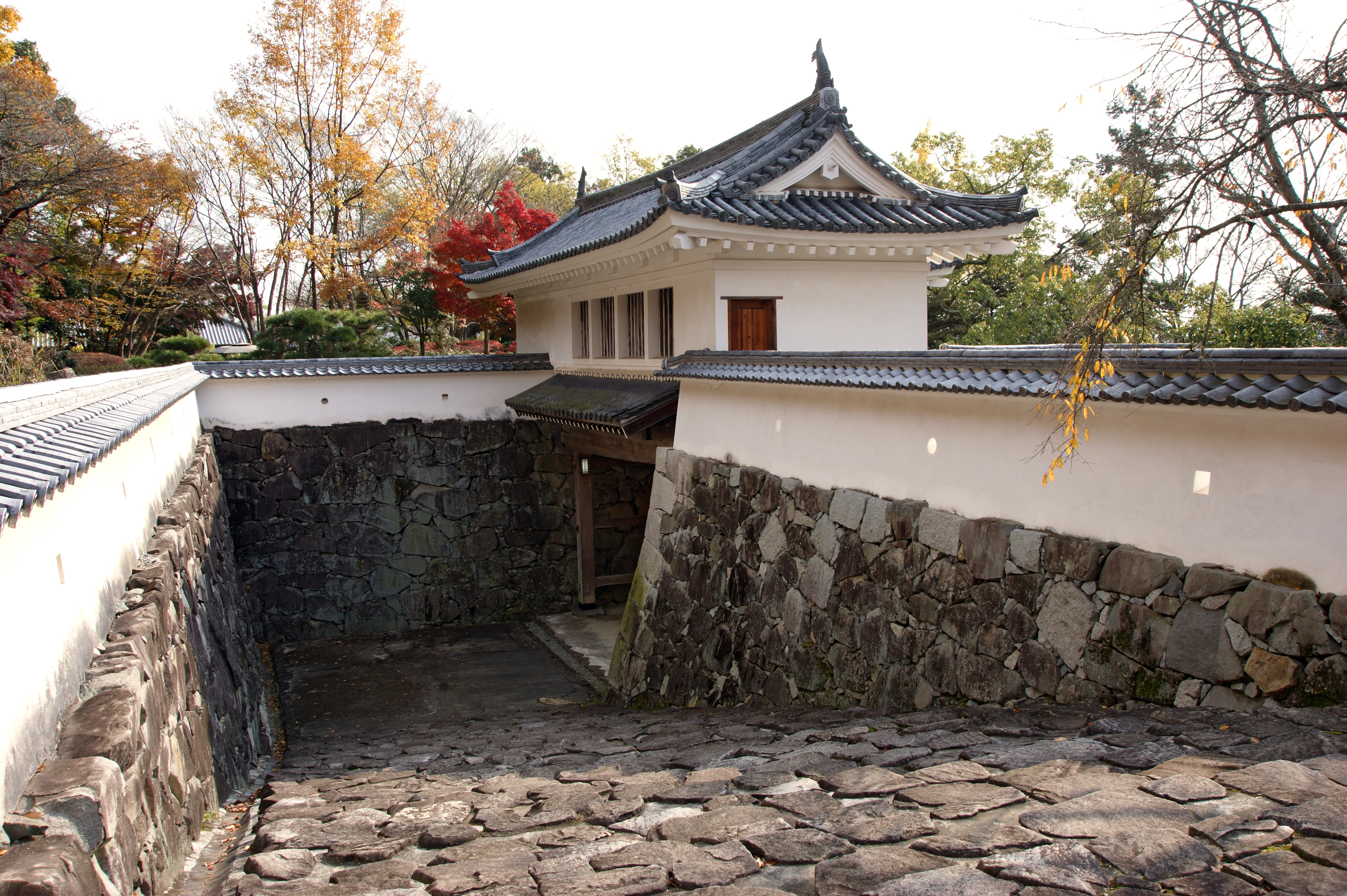
An uzumimon

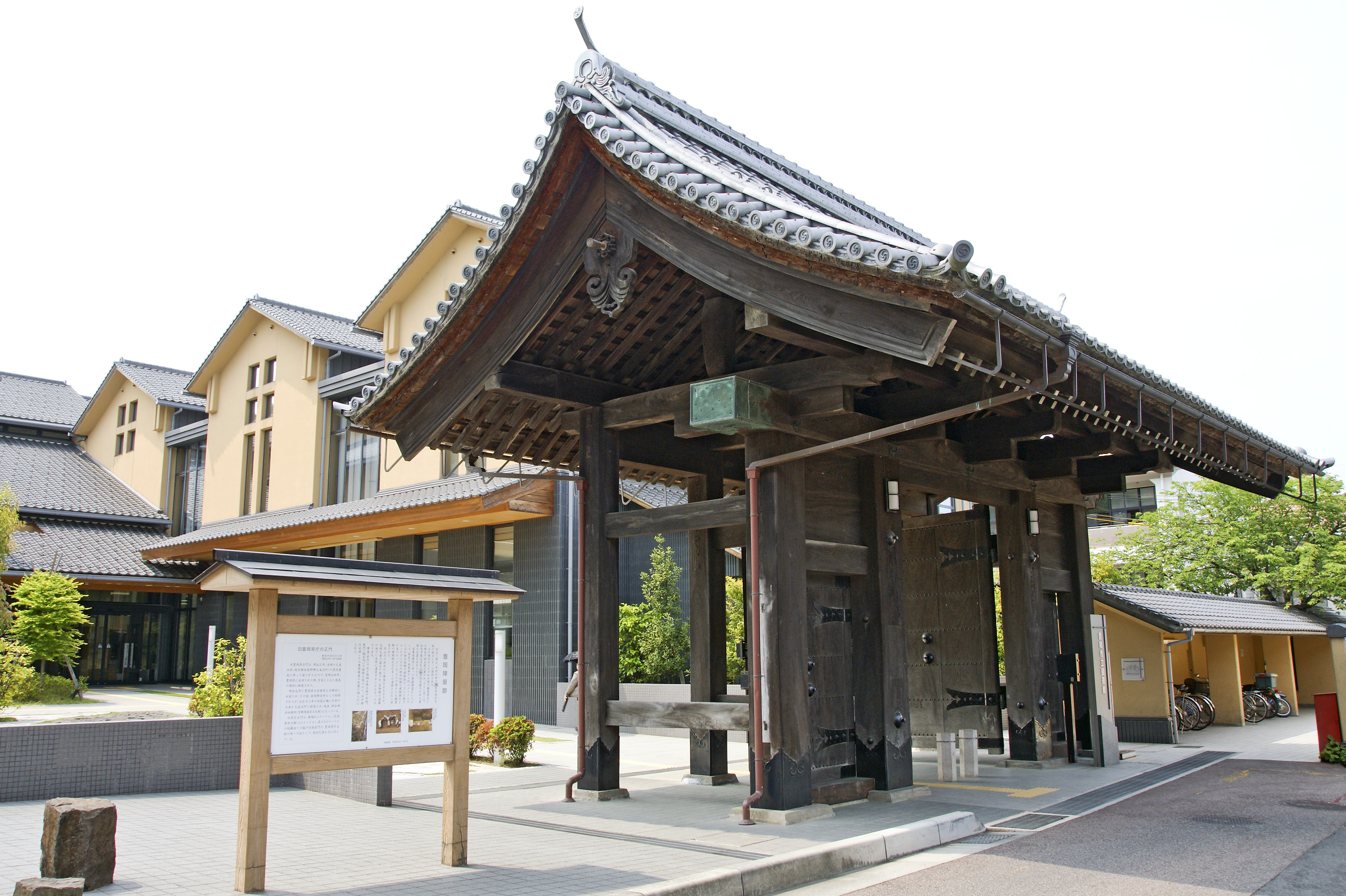
Yakuimon

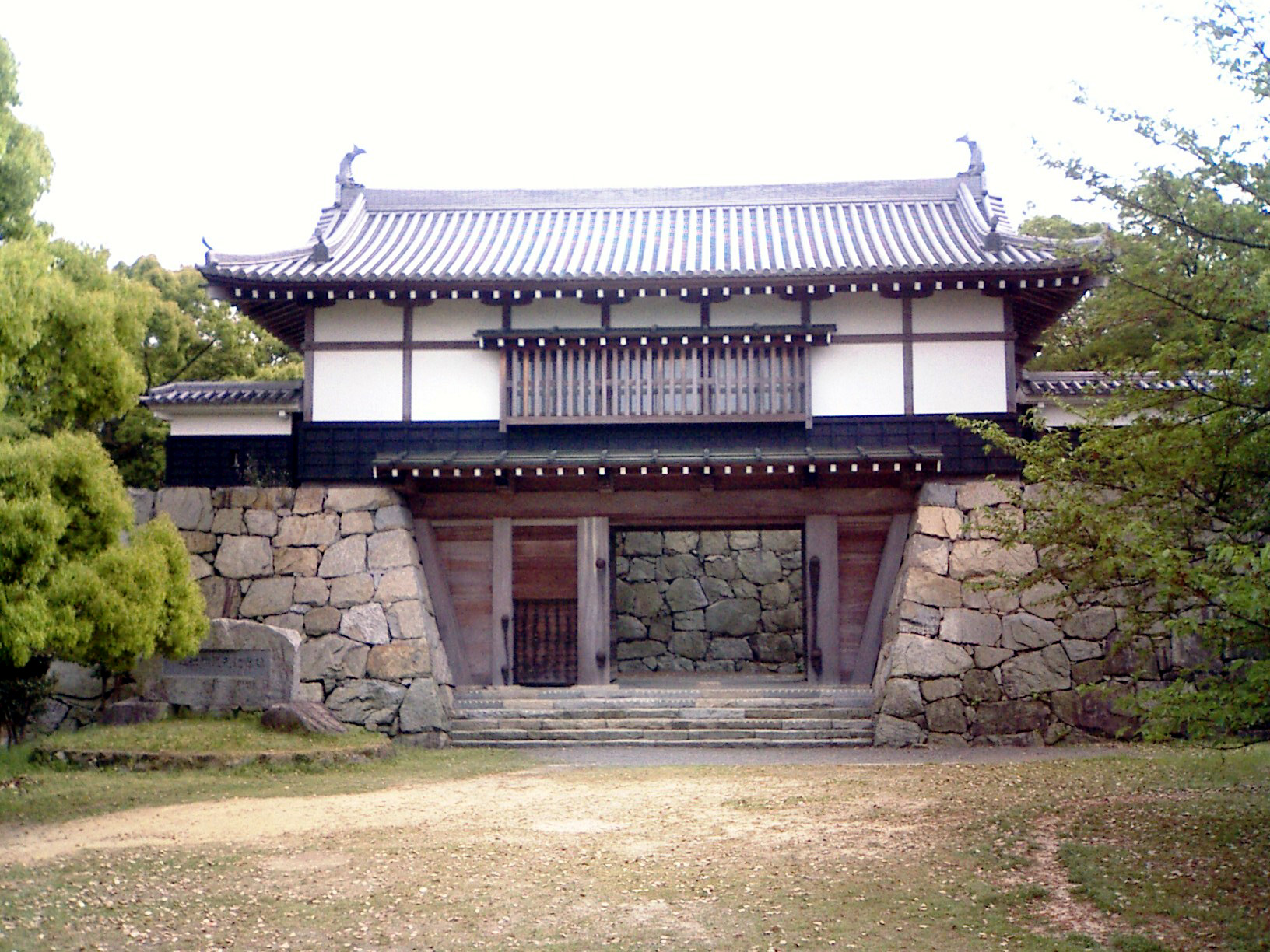
Yaguramon

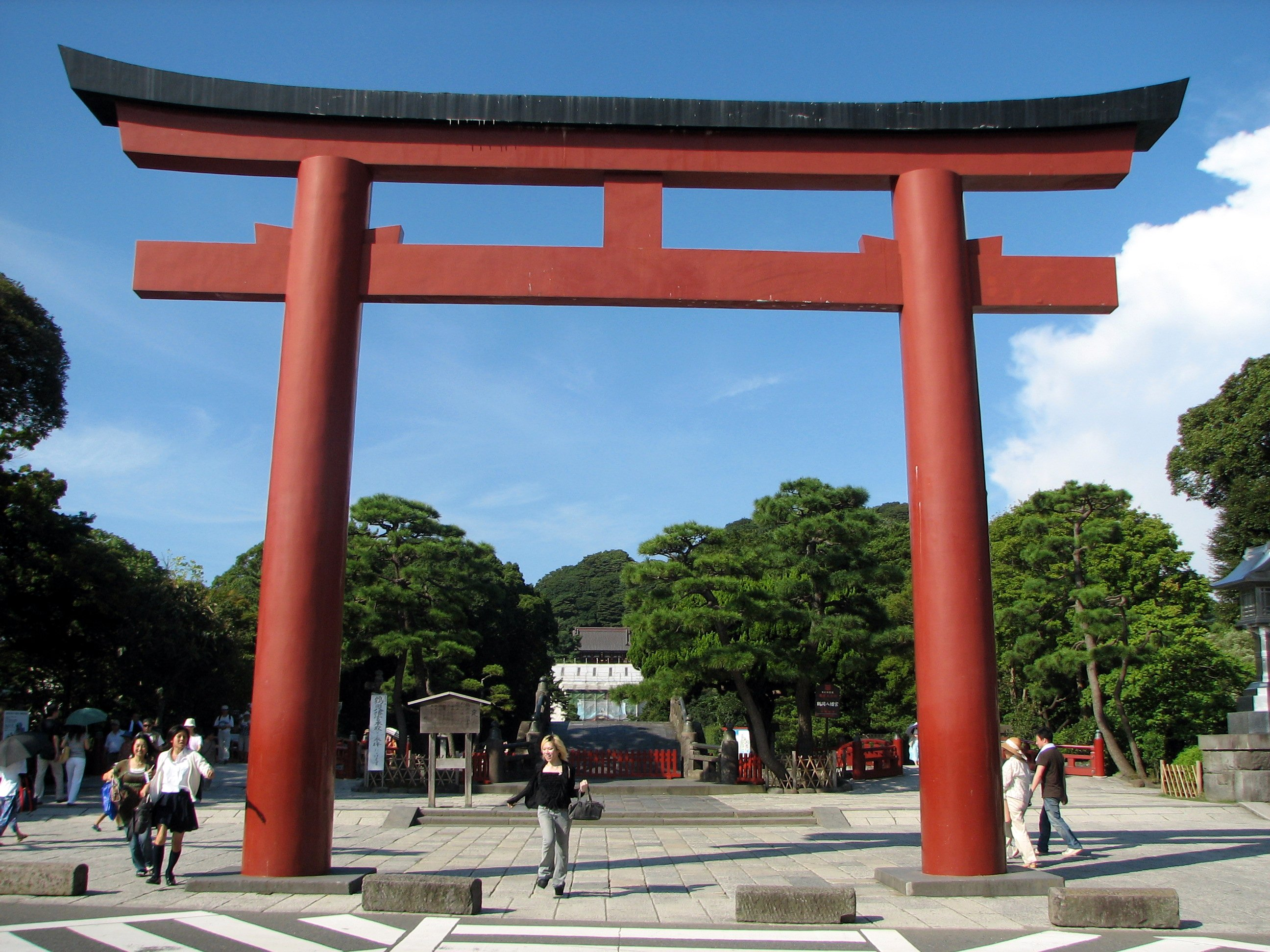
A red torii at the entrance of a Shinto shrine
