= Rōmon =

Type of gate in a Shinto shrine

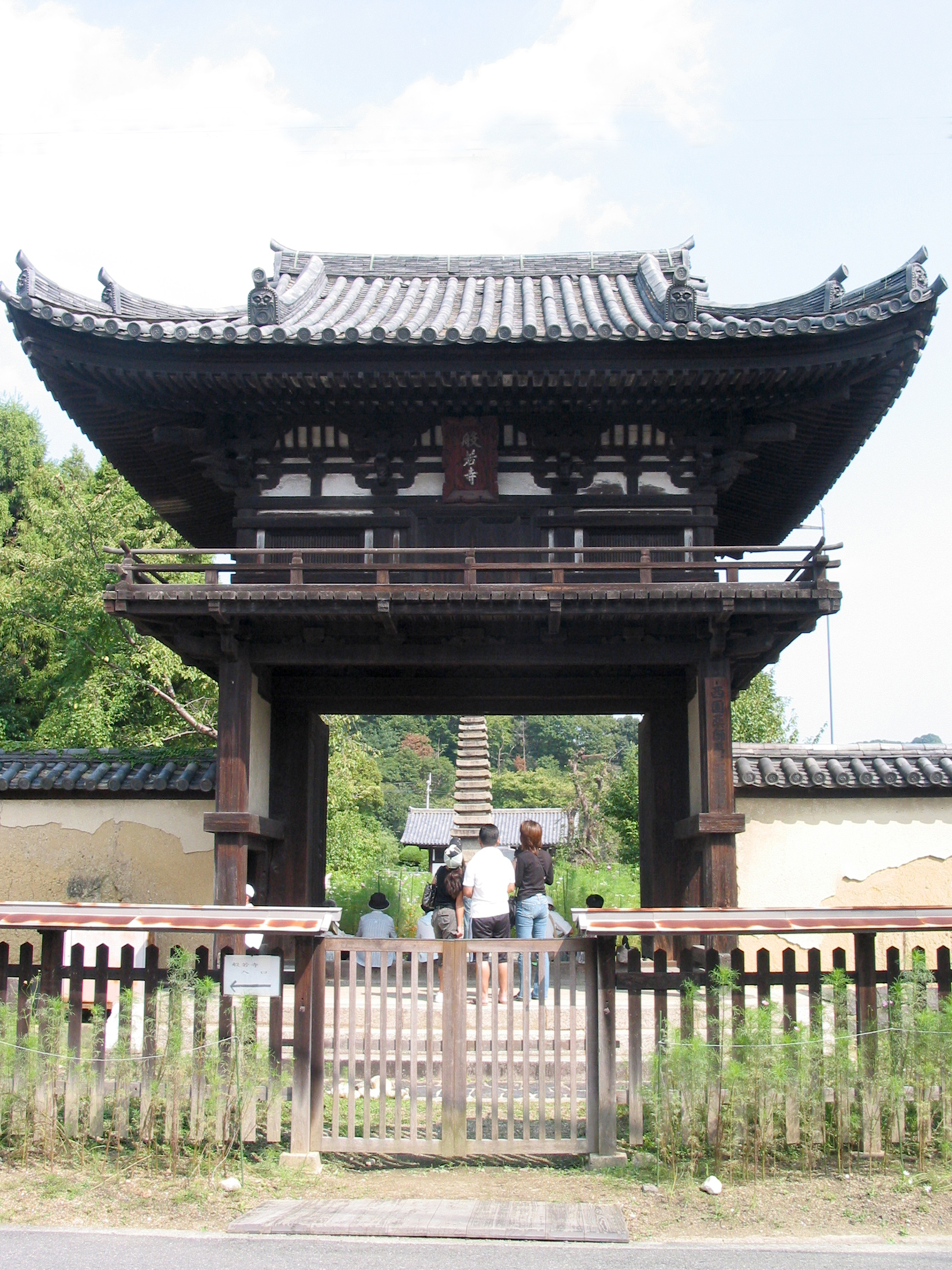
Rōmon at Hannya-ji, a National Treasure. Note the absence of stairs to the second story.

The rōmon (楼門; lit. 'tower gate') is one of two types of two-storied gates used in Japan (the other one being the nijūmon, see photo in the gallery below). Even though it was originally developed by Buddhist architecture, it is now used at both Buddhist temples and Shinto shrines. Its otherwise normal upper story is inaccessible and therefore offers no usable space. It is in this respect similar to the tahōtō (a two-storied pagoda) and the multi-storied pagoda, neither of which offers, in spite of appearances, usable space beyond the first story. In the past, the name also used to be sometimes applied to double-roof gates.

This extremely common single-roof gate was developed from the double-roofed nijūmon, replacing the flanking roof above the first floor with a very shallow balcony with a balustrade that skirts the entire upper story. Therefore, while the nijūmon has a series of brackets (tokyō) supporting the roof's eaves both at the first and at the second story, in the rōmon at the first floor these brackets just support the balcony, and have a different structure. The tokyō are usually three-stepped (mitesaki), but at the first floor they lack tail rafters.

Rōmon structure can vary greatly in its details. The upper area behind the balustrade for example can have muntined windows or a single window in the center bay. Side bays can be covered with white plaster. Rōmon usually, but not always, have a hip-and-gable (irimoya) roof. Dimensions go from Tōdai-ji's 5 bays to the more common 3-bays, down to even one bay.

== Gallery ==
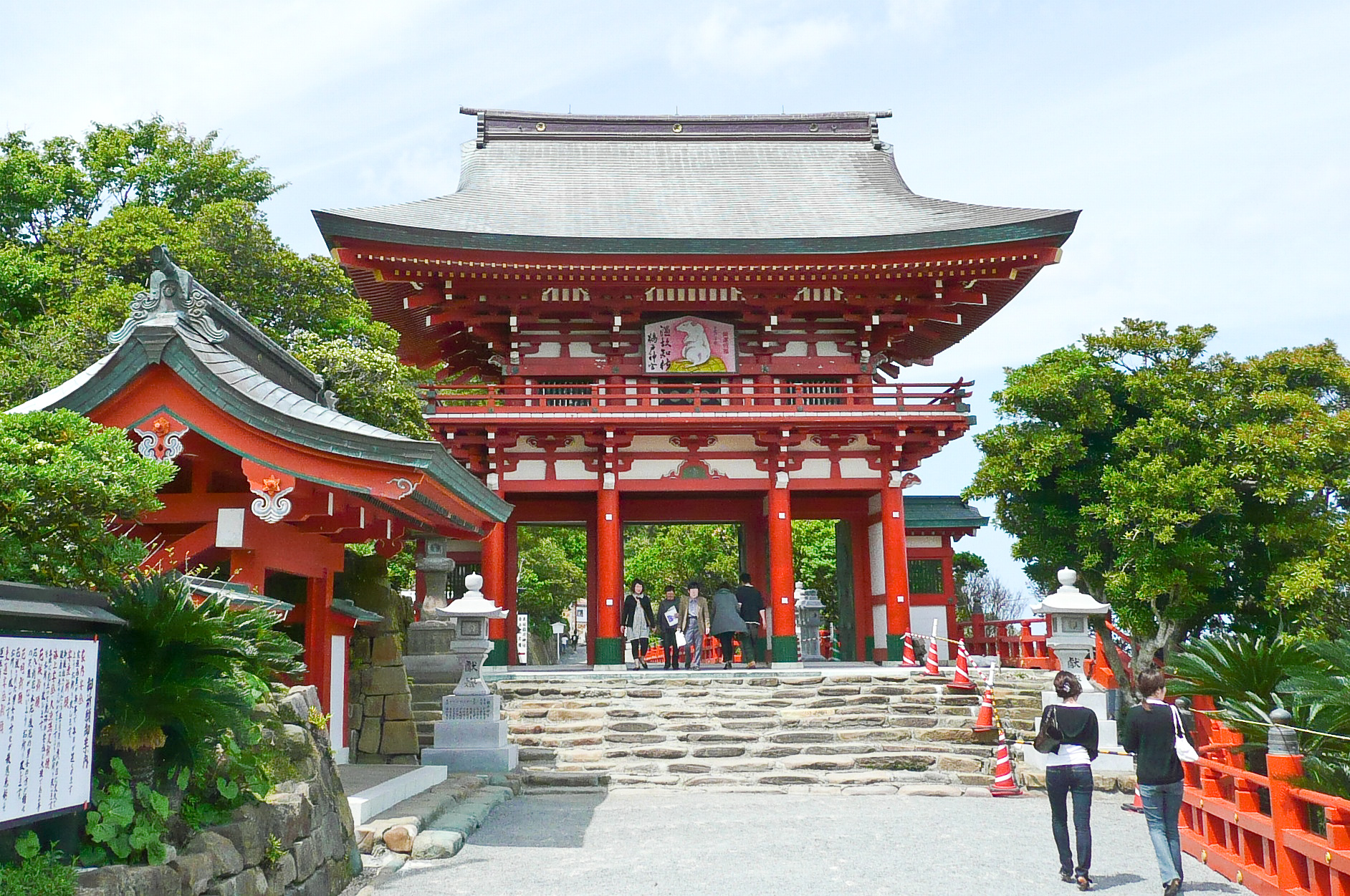
A rōmon. Note the single roof.

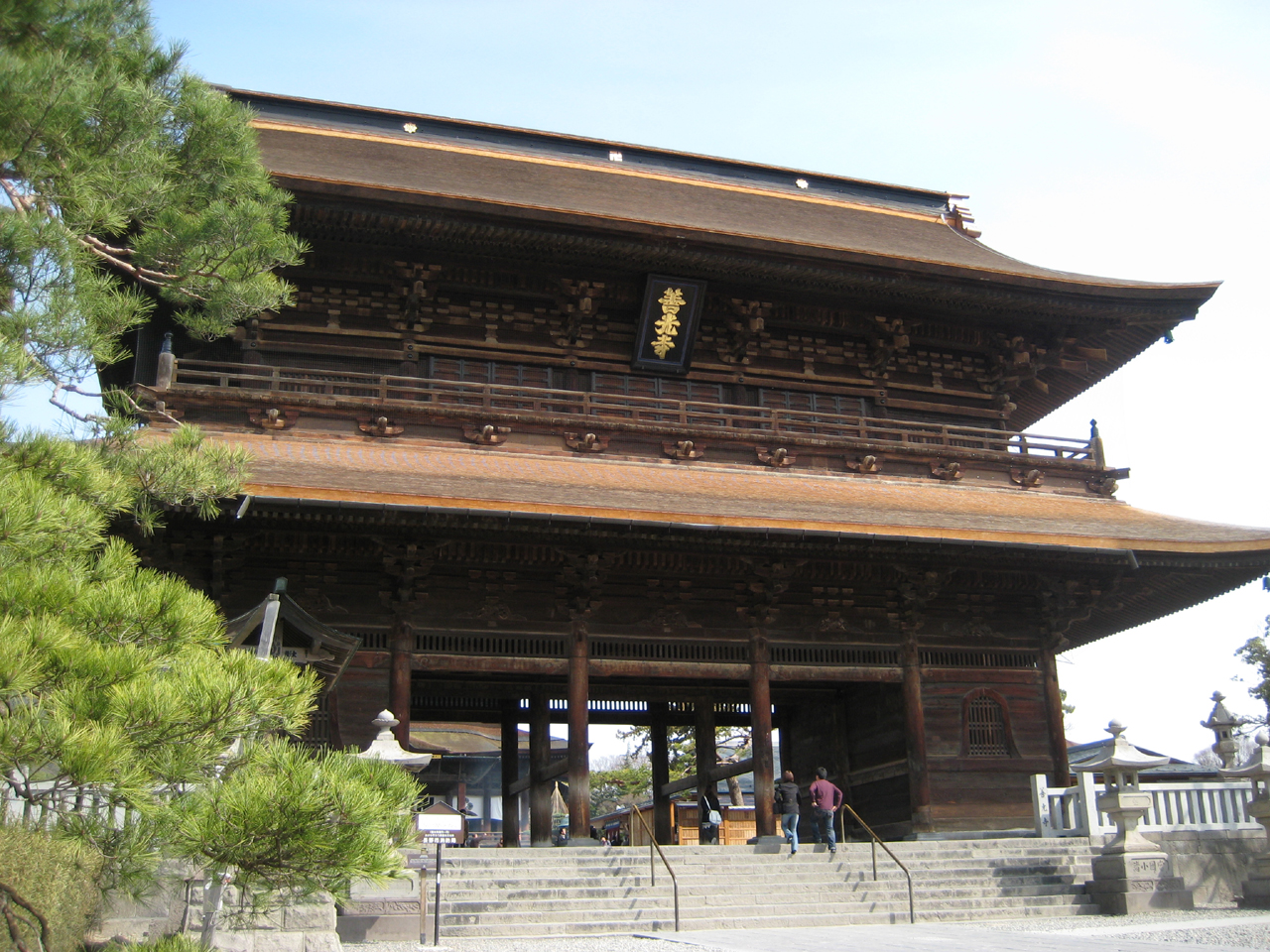
A nijūmon. Note the double roof.

== See also ==
- Mon (architecture)

== Bibliography ==
- Iwanami Nihonshi Jiten (岩波日本史辞典), CD-Rom Version. Iwanami Shoten, 1999-2001 (in Japanese)
- "Roumon". JAANUS – Japanese Architecture and Art Net User System.
- Fujita Masaya, Koga Shūsaku, ed. (April 10, 1990). Nihon Kenchiku-shi (in Japanese) (September 30, 2008 ed.). Shōwa-dō. ISBN 4-8122-9805-9.
- Young, David; Young, Michiko (2007) [2004]. The art of Japanese architecture. Architecture and Interior Design (illustrated, revised ed.). Tuttle Publishing. ISBN 978-0-8048-3838-2.
