= Japanese Architecture and Art Net Users System =

Japanese Architecture and Art Net Users System, or JAANUS, is an online dictionary of Japanese architecture and art terms compiled by Dr. Mary Neighbour Parent. It contains approximately eight thousand entries. It is searchable in both English and romaji and contains many hyperlinks and illustrations.

== See also ==
- Japanology
